This is a list of plays that have been adapted into feature films followed by a list of feature films based on stage plays or musicals.

Shakespeare plays

The Guinness Book of Records lists 410 feature-length film and TV versions of William Shakespeare's plays as having been produced, which makes him the most filmed author ever in any language.

The Internet Movie Database lists Shakespeare as having writing credit on 1,171 films, with 21 films in active production, but not yet released, . The earliest known production is King John from 1899.

Other plays
This is a list of plays other than those written by William Shakespeare (covered by the above section) that have been adapted into feature films. The title of the play is followed by its first public performance, its playwright, the title of the film adapted from the play, the year of the film and the film's director. If a film has an alternate title based on geographical distribution, the title listed will be that of the widest distribution area.

Films based on stage plays or musicals
This is a list of feature films based on stage plays or musicals.

0–9 
 7 Minutes (2016)
 7th Heaven (1927)
 8 Women (2002, musical)
 9/11 (2017)
 10 Things I Hate About You (1999)
 21 Days (1941)
 24 Hours (1931)
 The 24th Day (2004)
 29+1 (2017)
 39 East (1920)
 40 Carats (1973)
 The 47 Ronin (1941)
 77 Park Lane (1931)
 77 Rue Chalgrin (1931)
 84 Charing Cross Road (1987)
 360 (2011)
 1776 (1972, musical)
 1918 (1985)
 50 Million Frenchmen (1931)
 600,000 Francs a Month (1933)

A 
 Aaron Slick from Punkin Crick (1952)
 Abe Lincoln in Illinois (1940)
 Abie's Irish Rose (1928)
 Abie's Irish Rose (1946)
 About Last Night... (1986)
 About Last Night (2014)
 Aces High (1976)
 Accent on Youth (1935)
 The Acquittal (1923)
 Across the Pacific (1926)
 A Performance of Hamlet in the Village of Mrdusa Donja (1973)
 The Actress (1928)
 The Actress (1953)
 Adam and Eva (1923)
 The Adding Machine (1969)
 The Admirable Crichton (1918) 
 The Admirable Crichton (1957)
 Admirals All (1935)
 The Admiral's Secret (1934)
 Adolescence of Cain (1959)
 Adorable Julia (1962)
 Adrien (1943)
 Adrienne Lecouvreur (1938)
 Adriana Lecouvreur (1955)
 The Adulteress (1946)
 Adventure in Iraq (1943)
 Adventure Ltd. (1935)
 Adventurer at the Door (1961)
 The Adventures of Sherlock Holmes (1939)
 Advice from a Caterpillar (1999)
 Affairs of a Gentleman (1934)
 The Affairs of Anatol (1921)
 Afraid to Love (1927)
 Afraid to Talk (1932)
 Afsar (1950)
 After Dark (1915)
 After Five (1915)
 After Love (1948)
 After Office Hours (1932)
 After Tomorrow (1932)
 Aftermath (1914)
 Age-Old Friends (1989, TV)
 Agnes of God (1985)
 Agonija (1998)
 Ah, Wilderness! (1935)
 Äktenskapsbrottaren (1964)
 Aladdin's Other Lamp (1917)
 The Alarmist (1997)
 L'altra metà del cielo (1977)
 Alec Mapa: Baby Daddy (2015, TV)
 Alexander Hamilton (1931)
 Alfie (1966)
 Alfie (2004)
 Alias French Gertie (1930)
 Alias Jimmy Valentine (1920)
 Alias Jimmy Valentine (1928)
 Alias the Deacon (1927)
 Alias the Deacon (1940)
 Alibi (1929)
 Alibi (1931)
 All at Sea (1935)
 All for Mary (1955)
 All in a Night's Work (1961)
 All in Good Time (2012)
 All My Friends Are Leaving Brisbane (2007)
 All My Sons (1948)
 All of a Sudden Peggy (1920)
 All of Me (1934)
 All Remains to People (1963)
 All Soul's Eve (1921)
 All the King's Horses (1935)
 All the Way (2016, TV)
 All the Way Home (1963)
 All the Way Up (1970)
 Almost a Honeymoon (1930)
 Almost a Honeymoon (1938)
 Aloma of the South Seas (1926)
 Aloma of the South Seas (1941)
 Alsace (1916)
 Always a Bride (1940)
 Always in My Heart (1942)
 Amadeus (1984)
 The Amazing Dr. Clitterhouse (1938)
 The Amazons (1917)
 The Ambassador (1936)
 Amen. (2002)
 American Buffalo (1996)
 An American Citizen (1914)
 An American Daughter (2000, TV)
 American Love (1931)
 Americathon (1979)
 Amma (1949)
 Amphitryon (1935)
 L'Amore (1948)
 L'Amour, Madame (1952)
 The Amorous Prawn (1962)
 Andre's Mother (1990, TV)
 Angel (1937)
 An Angel from Texas (1940)
 An Ardent Heart (1953)
 An Enemy of the People (1978)
 An Ideal Husband (2000)
 An Inspector Calls (1954)
 Anastasia (1956)
 Anastasia (1997)
 The Ancestor (1936)
 The Ancestress (1919)
 Androcles and the Lion (1952)
 Angel (1937)
 Angels in America (2003, TV)
 Anima nera (1962)
 Animal Crackers (1930)
 The Animal Kingdom (1932)
 Anna Ascends (1922)
 Anna Christie (1923)
 Anna Christie (1930, English-language talkie)
 Anna Christie (1931, German-language talkie)
 Anna-Liisa (1922)
 Anna Lucasta (1949)
 Annabelle's Affairs (1931)
 Anne of the Thousand Days (1969)
 Annie (1982)
 Annie (1999, TV musical)
 Annie (2014, musical)
 Annie Get Your Gun (1950, musical)
 The Anniversary (1968)
 The Annunciation (1984)
 The Annunciation of Marie (1991)
 The Anonymous Roylott (1936)
 Another Country (1984)
 Another Dawn (1937)
 Another Harvest Moon (2009)
 Another Language (1933)
 Another Man's Poison (1951)
 Another Part of the Forest (1948)
 Another Scandal (1924)
 Antony and Cleopatra (1974, TV)
 Antigone (1961)
 Any Wednesday (1966)
 Anything (2017)
 Anything Goes (1936, musical)
 Anything Goes (1956, musical)
 Appassionatamente (1954)
 Appearances (1921)
 The Architect (2006)
 Are You a Mason? (1915)
 Are You Being Served? (1977)
 Aren't Men Beasts! (1937)
 Aren't We All? (1932)
 The Argyle Case (1917)
 The Argyle Case (1929)
 Aristocracy (1914)
 Arizona (1913)
 Arizona (1918)
 Arizona (1931)
 Arlette and Love (1943) 
 Arms and the Girl (1917)
 Arms and the Man (1932)
 Arms and the Man (1958)
 The Army Game (1961)
 Arsène Lupin (1916)
 Arsene Lupin (1917)
 Arsène Lupin (1932)
 Arsenic and Old Lace (1944)
 Arsenic & Old Lace (1962, TV)
 As Husbands Go (1934)
 As Is (1986, TV)
 As Long as They're Happy (1955)
 As You Desire Me (1932)
 As You Like It (1936)
 As You Like It (2006)
 Ashta Chamma (2008)
 Ask Beccles (1933)
 The Astonished Heart (1950)
 Assunta Spina (1915)
 Assunta Spina (1930)
 Assunta Spina (1948)
 A Talent for Murder (1981)
 At the End of the World (1921)
 At Your Orders, Madame (1939)
 At War with the Army (1950)
 Até que a Sbórnia nos Separe (2013)
 Atlantic (1929)
 Atlantik (1929)
 The Auctioneer (1927)
 August (1996)
 August: Osage County (2013)
 Autumn Crocus (1934)
 Auntie Mame (1958)
 Avanti! (1972)
 L'Avare (1980)
 L'Aventurier (1934)
 The Awakening of Helena Richie (1916)
 The Awful Truth (1925)
 The Awful Truth (1929)
 The Awful Truth (1937)
 The Aviator (1929)

B 
 The Baby Dance (1998, TV)
 Baby Doll (1956)
 Baby Face Harrington (1935)
 Baby Mine (1917)
 Baby Mine (1928)
 Baby Take a Bow (1934)
 Baby the Rain Must Fall (1965)
 The Bacchantes (1961)
 The Bacchae (2002)
 The Bachelor Father (1931)
 Bachelor Flat (1961)
 Bachelor's Affairs (1932)
 Background (1953)
 Bad Company (1986)
 Bad Girl (1931)
 Bad Manners (1997)
 The Bad Seed (1956)
 Badger's Green (1934)
 Badger's Green (1949)
 The Bait (1921)
 Bajo la metralla (1983)
 Bajó un ángel del cielo (1942)
 Balalaika (1939, musical)
 The Balcony (1963)
 Balkan Spy (1984)
 The Ballad of the Sad Cafe (1991)
 The Band Wagon (1953, musical)
 Bang Bang You're Dead (2002)
 Bankers Also Have Souls (1982)
 Bannerline (1951)
 Bar Girls (1994)
 Barbara Frietchie (1924)
 The Barbarian (1933)
 Barbarians (1953, Russian)
 Barefoot in Athens (1966)
 Barefoot in the Park (1967)
 The Barker (1928)
 The Baroness and the Butler (1938)
 The Bargain (1921)
 The Bargain (1931)
 The Baroness and the Butler (1938)
 The Barretts of Wimpole Street (1934)
 The Barretts of Wimpole Street (1957)
 The Barton Mystery (1920)
 The Barton Mystery (1949)
 Barrymore (2011)
 The Bat (1926)
 The Bat (1959)
 The Bat Whispers (1930)
 Beat the Band (1947)
 The Beast (1988)
 Beasts of the Southern Wild (2012)
 Beau Brummel (1924)
 Beau Brummell (1954)
 Beaumarchais (1996)
 The Beautiful Adventure (1932, French language)
 The Beautiful Adventure (1932, German language)
 The Beautiful Adventure (1942)
 The Beautiful Days of Aranjuez (2016)
 The Beautiful Sailor (1932)
 Beautiful Thing (1996)
 Beauty and the Barge (1914)
 Beauty and the Barge (1937)
 Beauty and the Boss (1932)
 The Beaver Coat (1928)
 The Beaver Coat (1937)
 The Beaver Coat (1949)
 Becket (1964)
 Becky Sharp (1935)
 Before Morning (1933)
 Before Sundown (1956)
 Beggar on Horseback (1925)
 The Beggar's Opera (1953)
 Behind the Scenes (1914)
 Being at Home with Claude (1992)
 Believe Me, Xantippe (1918, silent)
 Bell, Book and Candle (1958)
 Bella Donna (1915)
 Bella Donna (1923)
 La Belle Russe (1919)
 The Bells (1926)
 The Bells (1931)
 Bells Are Ringing (1960, musical)
 Bellyfruit (1999)
 Benilde or the Virgin Mother (1975)
 Bent (1997)
 Berkeley Square (1933)
 Bernardine (1957, musical)
 Besame Mucho (1987)
 Best Foot Forward (1943)
 The Best Little Whorehouse in Texas (1982, musical)
 The Best Man (1964) 
 The Best People (1925)
 Betrayal (1932)
 Betrayal (1983)
 Better Living  (1998)
 Between Night and Day (1932)
 Between Two Worlds (1944)
 Between Us (2012)
 Beware, My Lovely (1952)
 Beyond (1921)
 Beyond Therapy (1987)
 Big City Blues (1932)
 Big Hearted Herbert (1934)
 The Big Fight (1930)
 The Big Kahuna (1999)
 The Big Knife (1955)
 The Big Pond (1930)
 The Bigger Man (1915)
 A Bill of Divorcement (1922)
 A Bill of Divorcement (1932)
 A Bill of Divorcement (1940)
 Billie (1965)
 Billions (1920)
 Billy Bishop Goes to War (2010)
 Billy Budd (1962)
 Billy Liar (1963)
 Biloxi Blues (1988)
 Biography of a Bachelor Girl (1935)
 Bird of Paradise (1932)
 Bird of Paradise (1951)
 Birds of Prey (1930)
 The Birdcage (1996), based on La Cage aux Folles (1978)
 The Bishop Misbehaves (1935)
 The Birth of a Nation (1915)
 The Birthday Party (1968)
 Bitter Sweet (1933)
 Bitter Sweet (1940)
 The Bitter Tears of Petra von Kant (1972)
 Black Coffee (1931)
 Black Fury (1935)
 Black Girl (1972)
 The Black Hand Gang (1930)
 Black Joy (1977)
 Black Orpheus (1959)
 Black Waters (1929)
 Blackbirds (1915)
 Blackbirds (1920)
 Blackmail (1929)
 Blackrock (1997)
 The Blaireau Case (1923)
 The Blaireau Case (1932)
 Bleacher Bums (1979, TV)
 Bleacher Bums (2002, TV)
 Bleak Moments (1971)
 Blessed (2009)
 Blind Alley (1939)
 The Blind Goddess (1948)
 Blind Justice (1934)
 Blind Man's Bluff (1936)
 Blind Wives (1920)
 Blind Youth (1920)
 The Bliss of Mrs. Blossom (1968)
 Blithe Spirit (1945)
 Blonde Fever (1944)
 Blonde Inspiration (1941)
 Blood (2004)
 Blood Wedding (1981)
 The Blossoming of Kamiya Etsuko (2006)
 The Blue Fox (1938)
 The Blue Bird (1918)
 The Blue Bird (1940)
 The Blue Bird (1970)
 The Blue Bird (1976)
 Blue Bird (2011)
 Blue City Slammers (1987)
 Blue Denim (1959)
 Bluebeard's 8th Wife (1923)
 Bluebeard's Eighth Wife (1938)
 Blues for Willadean (2012)
 Blues in the Night (1941)
 Bodies, Rest & Motion (1993)
 Boeing Boeing (1965)
 De Boezemvriend (1982) 
 The Bofors Gun (1968)
 La Bohème (1926)
 Bombshell (1933)
 Bonheur, impair et passe (1977, TV)
 Le Bonheur (1934)
 Bonds of Love (1919)
 Boom! (1968)
 The Boarder (1953)
 Bordertown Café (1991)
 Boris Godunov (1954)
 Boris Godunov (1989)
 Born Yesterday (1950)
 Born Yesterday (1956, TV)
 Born Yesterday (1993) 
 The Boss (1915)
 The Boudoir Diplomat (1930)
 Boudu (2005)
 Boudu Saved from Drowning (1932)
 The Boy Friend (1926)
 Boy Meets Girl (1938)
 The Boy Who Loved Trolls (1984, TV)
 The Boys from Syracuse (1940)
 Boys in Brown (1949)
 The Boys in the Band (1970)
The Boys in the Band (2020)
 The Boys Next Door (1996, TV)
 Bracelets (1931)
 Bran Nue Dae (2010, musical)
 The Branded Woman (1920)
 The Brass Bottle (1923)
 The Brass Bottle (1964)
 The Brat (1931)
 Die Bräutigamswitwe (1931)
 Breaker Morant (1980)
 Breakfast at Sunrise (1927)
 The Breaking of the Drought (1920)
 Breaking Up (1997)
 A Breath of Scandal (1960)
 The Breed of the Treshams (1920)
 Brewster's Millions (1914)
 Brewster's Millions (1921)
 Brewster's Millions (1935)
 Brewster's Millions (1945)
 Bride of the Regiment (1930, musical)
 The Bride Wore Red (1937)
 Brides Are Like That (1936)
 The Bride's Play (1922)
 Brief Encounter (1945)
 Brief Encounter (1974)
 Brief Moment (1933)
 The Brig (1964)
 Brigadoon (1954, musical)
 Brighton Beach Memoirs (1986)
 The Brighton Twins (1936)
 Brilliant Lies (1996)
 British Intelligence (1940)
 Broadway (1929)
 Broadway (1942)
 Broadway Bound (1992, TV)
 Broadway Jones (1917)
 The Broken Circle Breakdown (2012)
 The Broken Jug (1937)
 Broken Lullaby (1932)
 The Broken Melody (1929)
 The Broken Wing (1923)
 The Broken Wing (1932)
 A Bronx Tale (1993)
 Broth of a Boy (1959)
 Brother Alfred (1932)
 A Brother's Kiss (1997)
 Brown of Harvard (1918)
 Brown of Harvard (1926)
 Brown Sugar (1922)
 Brown Sugar (1931)
 The Browning Version (1951)
 The Browning Version (1994)
 Brumby Innes (1927)
 Bulldog Drummond (1922)
 Bulldog Drummond (1929)
 Butcher, Baker, Nightmare Maker (1981)
 Buddy Buddy (1981)
 Buffalo Bill and the Indians, or Sitting Bull's History Lesson (1976)
 Bug (2006)
 A Bunch of Violets (1916)
 Bunker Bean (1936)
 The Burgomaster of Stilemonde (1929)
 Burglars(1930)
 Buridan's Donkey (1932)
 Burning Blue (2013)
 The Burning Question (1943)
 Burnt Wings (1920)
 Bus Stop (1956)
 Business Under Distress (1931)
 But the Flesh Is Weak (1932)
 But Not for Me (1959)
 Butley (1974)
 The Butter and Egg Man (1928)
 Butterflies Are Free (1972)
 By Candlelight (1933)
 Bye Bye Birdie (1963, musical)
 Byzantium (2012)

C 
 Cabaret (1972, musical)
 Cabaret Balkan (1998)
 Cabin in the Sky (1943, musical)
 Cactus Flower (1969)
 Caesar and Cleopatra (1945)
 Caesar and Cleopatra (2009)
 La Cage aux Folles (1978)
 Cain XVIII (1963)
 A Caixa (1994)
 La calandria (1933)
 La calandria (1972)
 El Calavera (1954)
 The Calendar (1931)
 The Calendar (1948)
 California Suite (1978)
 Call It a Day (1937)
 Call Me Madam (1953)
 The Call of Her People (1917)
 The Call of the North (1914)
 The Call of the North (1921)
 Calle Mayor (1956)
 Called Back (1911)
 Calzonzin Inspector (1977)
 Camelot (1967, musical)
 Cameo Kirby (1914)
 Cameo Kirby (1923)
 Cameo Kirby (1930)
 Camille (1915)
 Camille (1917)
 Camille (1921)
 Camille (1926)
 Camille (1936)
 Camille (1984)
 Al Compás de tu Mentira (1950)
 Comrades (1919)
 The Canadian (1926)
 Canaries Sometimes Sing (1930)
 Can-Can (1960, musical)
 Canción de cuna (1941)
 Candida, Millionairess (1941)
 Caprice (1913)
 Captain Alvarez (1914)
 Captain Applejack (1931)
 The Captain from Köpenick (1931)
 The Captain from Köpenick (1956)
 The Captain Is a Lady (1940)
 Captain Kidd, Jr. (1919)
 Captain Midnight, the Bush King (1911)
 The Captive (1915)
 The Cardboard Lover (1928) 
 Cardinal Richelieu (1935)
 Career (1959)
 The Careless Age (1929)
 The Caretaker (1963)
 Carlos (1971)
 Carmen Jones (1954, musical)
 Carnage (2011), based on the play God of Carnage
 Carolina (1934)
 Carousel (1956, musical)
 Carousel (1967, TV)
 Carry On Admiral (1957)
 La casa del pelícano (1977)
 Casablanca (1942)
 Casanova Brown (1944)
 The Case of Becky (1915)
 The Case of Becky (1921)
 The Case of Lady Camber (1920)
 The Case of the Frightened Lady (1940)
 Cast a Dark Shadow (1955)
 La Casta Susana (1944)
 The Cat and the Canary (1927)
 The Cat and the Canary (1939)
 The Cat and the Canary (1979)
 Cat on a Hot Tin Roof (1958)
 Cat on a Hot Tin Roof (1984, TV)
 The Cat Creeps (1930)
 The Catered Affair (1956)
 Catherine de Heilbronn (1980, TV)
 Cats (1998)
 Cats (2019)
 Caught in the Act (1931)
 Cavalcade (1933)
 The Cave Girl (1921)
 The Caveman (1915)
 A Celebrated Case (1914)
 The Chalice of Sorrow (1916)
 The Chalk Garden (1964)
 The Chance of a Night Time (1931)
 Chance the Idol (1927)
 The Changeling (1998)
 Chapter Two (1979)
 Charlemagne (1933)
 Charley's Aunt (1925)
 Charley's Aunt (1926)
 Charley's Aunt (1930)
 Charley's Aunt (1941)
 Charley's Aunt (1963)
 Charlie Chan in City in Darkness (1939)
 Charming Sinners (1929)
 The Chase (1966)
 The Chaste Libertine (1952)
 Chatroom (2010)
 Chatterbox (1936)
 A che servono questi quattrini? (1942)
 The Cheater (1920)
 Cheating Cheaters (1919)
 Cheating Cheaters (1927)
 Cheating Cheaters (1934)
 Cheech (2006)
 The Cheeky Devil (1932)
 The Cheerful Soul (1919)
 Chelsea Walls (2001)
 The Cherry Orchard (1974)
 The Cherry Orchard (1981, TV)
 The Cherry Orchard (1999)
 Chicago (1927)
 Chicago (2002, musical)
 Chicken Every Sunday (1949)
 La Chienne (1931)
 Child of Manhattan (1933)
 Children of a Lesser God (1986)
 Children of Jazz (1923)
 The Children's Hour (1961)
 Child's Play (1972)
 Chimmie Fadden (1915)
 Chinese Coffee (2000)
 The Chinese Puzzle (1919)
 Chi-Raq (2015, musical)
 The Chocolate Girl (1932)
 The Chocolate Girl (1950)
 The Chocolate Soldier (1941)
 The Choice (2015)
 The Chorus Lady (1915)
 The Chorus Lady (1924)
 A Chorus Line (1985, musical)
 A Chorus of Disapproval (1989)
 Chotard et Cie (1933)
 The Christian (1911)
 The Christian (1914)
 The Christian (1923)
 Christmas in July (1940)
 Christine (1958)
 Christopher Bean (1933)
 The Church Mouse (1934)
 Ciboulette (1933)
 Cinderella (1957, TV) 
 The Circle (1925)
 Circle of Love (1964)
 The City (1916)
 The City (1926)
 City Girl (1930)
 A City Upside Down (1933)
 Civilian Clothes (1920)
 The Clairvoyant (1924) 
 Clarence (1922)
 Clarence (1937)
 Clara Gibbings (1934)
 Clash by Night (1952)
 Classmates (1914)
 Claudia (1943)
 Clérambard (1969)
 Cleopatra (1912)
 Cleopatra (1917)
 The Climax (1930)
 The Climax (1944)
 The Climbers (1915)
 The Climbers (1919)
 The Climbers (1927)
 The Clinging Vine (1926)
 Closed Door (1962)
 Closer (2004)
 Clothes (1914)
 Clothes (1920)
 The Club (1980)
 The Cobweb (1917)
 Cocoanut (1939)
 The Cocoanuts (1929)
 The Cockeyed Miracle (1946)
 The Cock-Eyed World (1929, musical)
 The Cockroach that Ate Cincinnati (1996)
 The Cohens and Kellys (1926)
 Cold Comfort (1989)
 The College Widow
 The College Widow
 The Colleen Bawn (1911, American)
 The Colleen Bawn (1911, Australian)
 The Colleen Bawn  (1924)
 The Colonel (1917)
 Come Again Smith (1919)
 Come Back, Little Sheba (1952)
 Come Back, Little Sheba (1978, TV)
 Come Back to the Five and Dime, Jimmy Dean, Jimmy Dean (1982)
 Come Blow Your Horn (1963)
 Come Look at Me (2001)
 Come Out of the Kitchen (1919)
 Command Decision (1948)
 The Common Cause (1919)
 Common Clay (1919)
 Common Clay (1930)
 Comrades (1919)
 The Commuters (1915)
 The Concert (1921)
 The Concert (1931)
 The Condemned of Altona (1962)
 A Coney Island Princess (1916)
 The Connection (1961)
 The Conspiracy (1914)
 Conspiracy (1930)
 The Constant Nymph (1928)
 The Constant Nymph (1933)
 The Constant Nymph (1943)
 The Constant Woman (1933)
 Convicts (1991)
 Cooee and the Echo (1912)
 Copenhagen (2002, TV)
 The Copperhead (1920)
 Coquette (1929)
 Coriolanus (2011)
 The Corn Is Green (1945)
 The Corn Is Green (1979, TV)
 Cosi (1996)
 Les Côtelettes (2003)
 Cottage to Let (1941)
 Counsellor at Law (1933)
 Counsel's Opinion (1933)
 The Count of Brechard (1938)
 The Count of Charolais (1922)
 Counter-Attack (1945)
 Country Life (1994)
 The Country Girl (1954)
 The County Chairman (1914)
 The County Fair (1920)
 Courage (1930)
 The Courier of Moncenisio (1927)
 Courtship (1987)
 Cousin Kate (1921)
 The Cow (1969)
 The Cowboy and the Lady (1915)
 The Cowboy and the Lady (1922)
 Cowboys (2013)
 The Cradle (1922)
 Cradle Snatchers (1927)
 Cradle Song (1933)
 Cradle Song (1953)
 Cradle Song (1994)
 Craig's Wife (1936)
 The Cranes Are Flying (1957)
 Crashing Hollywood (1938)
 The Crazy Day or The Marriage of Figaro (2003, TV)
 Creditors (1988)
 Creditors (2015)
 Creeping Shadows (1931)
 Crimes of the Heart (1986)
 The Criminal Code (1931)
 Critic's Choice (1963)
 The Cross-Patch (1935)
 Cross My Heart (1946)
 Crossing Delancey (1988)
 The Crowded Hour (1925)
 The Crucible (1957)
 The Crucible (1996)
 A Cruel Romance (1984)
 The Crusader (1932)
 Cry 'Havoc' (1943)
 The Cub (1915)
 Cuchillos de fuego (1989)
 A Cuckoo in the Nest (1933)
 The Cuckoos (1930)
 The Cucuroux Family (1953)
 Los Cuervos están de luto (1965)
 The Curious Conduct of Judge Legarde (1915)
 Curse of the Golden Flower (2006)
 Curse of the Starving Class (1994)
 Cymbeline (2014)
 Cynthia (1947)
 Cyrano Agency (2010)
 Cyrano and d'Artagnan (1964)
 Cyrano de Bergerac (1925)
 Cyrano de Bergerac (1946)
 Cyrano de Bergerac (1950)
 Cyrano de Bergerac (1972, TV)
 Cyrano de Bergerac (1990)
 Cyrano de Bergerac (2008, TV)
 Cyrano Fernandez (2007)

D 
 Da (1988)
 Daddy (2015)
 Daddy Gets Married (1936)
 Daddy's Gone A-Hunting (1925)
 La dama de Chez Maxim's (1923)
 Damaged Goods (1914)
 Damaged Goods (1919)
 Damaged Lives (1933)
 La dame de chez Maxim's (1933)
 Damn Yankees (1958, musical)
 A Damsel in Distress (1937)
 Dance Charlie Dance (1937)
 The Dance of Death (1948)
 Dance of Death (film) (1969)
 The Dance of Death (1967)
 The Dance of Life (1929)
 The Dancers (1925)
 The Dancers (1930)
 Dancing at Lughnasa (1998)
 The Dancing Girl (1915)
 Dancing in the Dark (1949)
 Dancing Mothers (1926)
 The Danger Mark (1918)
 Dangerous Afternoon (1961)
 Dangerous Corner (1934)
 Dangerous Crossing (1953)
 The Dangerous Game (1933)
 Dangerous Liaisons (1988)
 De Dans van de Reiger (1966)
 Danton (1921)
 Danton (1983)
 The Dark Angel (1925)
 The Dark Angel (1935)
 The Dark at the Top of the Stairs (1960)
 The Dark Past (1948)
 Dark Streets (2008)
 Dark Victory (1939)
 Darkness Falls (1999)
 Darling, How Could You! (1951)
 The Daughter (2015)
 Daughter of Deceit (1951)
 Daughters Courageous (1939)
 David Garrick (1916)
 David Harum (1915)
 The Dawn of a Tomorrow (1915)
 A Day in the Death of Joe Egg (1968)
 Day of Wrath (1943)
 Daybreak (1918 film)
 Days and Nights (2013)
 Days of Wine and Roses (1962)
 Dead End (1937)
 Dear Ruth (1947)
 Dear Mr. Prohack (1949)
 Dear Octopus (1943)
 Death and the Maiden (1994)
 Death of a Salesman (1951)
 Death of a Salesman (1966, TV)
 Death of a Salesman (1985, TV)
 Death of a Salesman (2000, TV)
 Death of an Angel (1952)
 Death of Yazdgerd (1982)
 Death Takes a Holiday (1934)
 Deathtrap (1982)
 Deathwatch (1965)
 Decadence (1994)
 The Decision of Christopher Blake (1948)
 Deception (1946)
 Déclassée (1925)
 The Deep Blue Sea (1955)
 The Deep Blue Sea (2011)
 The Deep Purple (1915)
 The Deep Purple (1920)
 A Delicate Balance (1973)
 Delusions of Grandeur (1971)
 The Denial (1925)
 Departure (1986)
 The Deputy Drummer (1935, musical)
 The Desert Song (1929)
 The Desert Song (1953)
 Deserted at the Altar (1922)
 Design for Living (1933)
 The Designated Mourner (1997)
 Desire (1936)
 Désiré (1996)
 Desire Under the Elms (1958)
 Desk Set (1957)
 Desperate Hours (1990)
 The Desperate Hours (1955)
 Detective Story (1951)
 Detention of the Dead (2012)
 The Devil (1915)
 The Devil (1918)
 The Devil (1921)
 Devil-May-Care (1929)
 A Devil of a Woman (1951)
 The Devils (1971)
 The Devil's Brother (1933)
 The Devil's Disciple (1959)
 The Devil's Maze (1929)
 Dial M for Murder (1954)
 The Diary of a Chambermaid (1946)
 Diary of a Mad Black Woman (2005)
 The Diary of Anne Frank (1959)
 The Diary of Anne Frank (1967)
 The Dictator (1915)
 The Dictator (1922)
 Dicky Monteith (1922)
 Die große Liebe (1931)
 Die, Mommie, Die! (2003)
 Different Morals (1931)
 Dimboola (1979)
 Dinner at Eight (1933)
 Dinner at Eight (1989, TV)
 The Dinner Game (1998)
 Dinner with Friends (2001, TV)
 Diplomacy (1916)
 Diplomacy (1926)
 Diplomacy (2014)
 Dionysus in '69 (1970)
 Dishonored Lady (1947)
 Disco Pigs (2001)
 Disraeli (1921)
 Disraeli (1929)
 The Distant Land (1987)
 Distress (1946)
 Divinas palabras (1977)
 Divinas palabras (1987)
 The Divorce of Lady X (1938)
 The Divorcee (1919)
 The Divorcee (1930) 
 Do Not Disturb (1965)
 Do Not Disturb (2014)
 Do Not Part with Your Beloved (1980)
 Doctor Bertram (1957)
 Doctor Faustus (1967)
 The Doctor in Spite of Himself (1999)
 The Doctor of the Mad (1954)
 Doctor Praetorius (1950)
 The Doctor's Dilemma (1958) 
 Dodsworth (1936)
 The Dog in the Manger (1978)
 The Dog in the Manger (1996)
 A Dog's Will (2000)
 Doll Face (1945)
 A Doll's House (1917)
 A Doll's House (1918)
 A Doll's House (1922)
 A Doll's House (1943)
 A Doll's House (1959)
 A Doll's House (1973)
 A Doll's House (1973)
 A Doll's House (1992, TV)
 The Dominant Sex (1937)
 Don Cesar, Count of Irun (1918)
 Don Cesare di Bazan (1942)
 Don Juan (1998)
 Don Juan in Hell (1991)
 Don Quixote (1957)
 Doña Clarines (1951)
 Don's Party (1976)
 Don't Call It Love (1923)
 Don't Drink the Water (1969)
 Don't Drink the Water (1994, TV)
 Don't Give Up (film) (1947)
 Don't Tell the Wife (1927)
 Door on the Left as You Leave the Elevator (1988)
 Doorsteps (1916)
 Dora Nelson (1935)
 Dora Nelson (1939)
 Dorothea Angermann (1959)
 Double Door (film) (1934)
 The Double Event (1921)
 Double Harness (1933)
 A Double Life (1954)
 Double Suicide (1918)
 Double Suicide (1969)
 Double Wedding (1937)
 Doubt (2008)
 Doubting Thomas (1935)
 The Doughgirls (1944)
 The Dove (1927)
 Down and Out in Beverly Hills (1986)
 Downhill (1927)
 Dr. Monica (1934)
 Dracula (1931, English language)
 Dracula (1931, Spanish language)
 Dracula (1979)
 Drake of England (1935)
 Dramatic School (1938)
 The Drawer Boy (2017)
 Dream Girl (1948)
 A Dream of Passion (1978)
 Dream of Love (1928)
 Dreamgirls (2006, musical)
 Dreaming Lips (1932)
 Dreaming Lips (1937)
 Dreaming Lips (1953)
 Dreamplay (1994)
 Drei Mann auf einem Pferd (1957)
 Dressed to Thrill (1935, musical)
 The Dresser (1983)
 The Dresser (2015, TV)
 The Dressmaker of Luneville (1932)
 Dreyfus (1931)
 Drifting (1923)
 Driven (1916)
 Driving Miss Daisy (1989)
 Driving Miss Daisy (2014)
 Drums O' Voodoo (1934)
 Drunks (1995)
 Dry Rot (1956)
 DuBarry (1915)
 Du Barry Was a Lady (1943)
 Du Barry, Woman of Passion (1930)
 The Duchess of Benameji (1949)
 Duck in Orange Sauce (1975)
 Duet for One (1986)
 Dulcinea (1963)
 Dulcy (1923)
 Dulcy (1940)
 The Dumb Girl of Portici (1916)
 Dusty Ermine (1936)
 Dutchman (1966)
 The Dybbuk (1938)
 The Dying Gaul (2005)

E 
 The Eaglet (1913 film)
 Earth Spirit (film) (1923)
 The Easiest Way (1917 film)
 The Easiest Way (1931)
 East Is East (1916 film) 
 East Is East (1999 film)
 East Is West (1922 film)
 East Is West (1930)
 Easy Money (1948 film)
 East of Suez (film) (1925)
 Easy to Love (1934 film) 
 Easy Virtue (1928 film)
 Easy Virtue (2008 film)
 Edmond (2005)
 Educating Rita (1983)
 The Education of Elizabeth (1921)
 Education of a Prince (1927)
 The Education of Mr. Pipp (1914)
 Edward II (film) (1991)
 Edward, My Son (1949)
 The Effect of Gamma Rays on Man-in-the-Moon Marigolds (1972)
 Eight Iron Men (1952)
 Elckerlyc (film) (1975)
 The Elder Son (2006 film) 
 Electra (1962 film) 
 The Elephant Man (film) (1980)
 The Elephant Man (1982 film) (TV)
 The Eleventh Commandment (1924 film)
 Elmer, the Great (1933)
 Emerald City (film) (1988)
 The Emperor Jones (1933)
 Emilia Galotti (film) (1958)
 L'emmerdeur (1973)
 Emmett Stone (1985)
 Employees' Entrance (1933)
 The Enchanted Cottage (1924 film) 
 The Enchanted Cottage (1945 film) 
 Endgame (1989 film) (from play by Samuel Beckett
 Endless Nights in Aurora (2014)
 An Enemy of the People (film) (1978)
 An Enemy to the King (film) (1916)
 Enter Laughing (film) (1967)
 Enter Madame (1922 film)
 Enter Madame (1935 film)
 The Entertainer (film) (1960)
 Entertaining Mr Sloane (film) (1970)
 L'Épervier (1933)
 Equus (1977)
 Erotikon (1920 film) 
 Erstwhile Susan (1919)
 Escanaba in da Moonlight (2001)
 Escapade (1955 film)
 The Escape (1914 film)
 Escape (1930 film) 
 Escape (1948 film) 
 Escape Me Never (1935 film)
 Escape Me Never (1947 film)
 Escuela para suegras (1958)
 Esmeralda (1915 film)
 Espionage (film) (1937)
 La estatua de carne (1951)
 The Eternal City (1915 film)
 Ethir Neechal (1968)
 Étienne (film) (1933)
 The Eve of St. Mark (1944)
 Eve's Daughter (1918)
 Eve's Secret (1925)
 Evening Clothes (1927)
 Evensong (film) (1934)
 Eve's Secret (1925)
 The Ever Open Door (1920)
 Everybody Wins (1990)
 Everynight ... Everynight (1994)
 Everywoman (1919 film)
 Evidence (1915 film)
 Evidence (1929 film)
 Evita (1996, musical)
 Excess Baggage (1928 film)
 Un extraño en la escalera (1955)
 Extravagance (1916 film)
 Excuse Me (1925 film)
 The Expert (1932 film) (1932)
 Extremities (film) (1986, TV)
 Eye for Eye (1918 film)
 Eyes of Youth (1919)

F 
 The F Word (2013 film) 
 The Face Behind the Mask (1941 film) 
 The Face at the Window (1920 film)
 The Face of Jizo (film) (2004)
 The Faces of Love (film) (1924)
 Faces of Love (1977)
 Face to Face (2011 film) 
 Fair and Warmer (film) (1919)
 The Fair Co-Ed (1927)
 Fair Game (1928 film) 
 Fairy tales... fairy tales... fairy tales of the old Arbat (1982)
 The Faith Healer (1921)
 The Fake (1927 film)
 La falena (film) (1916)
 The Fall Guy (1930 film)
 False Servant (2000)
 A Family Affair (1937 film) 
 The Family Way (1966)
 The Famous Mrs. Fair (1923)
 The Fan (1949 film) 
 Fando y Lis (1968)
 Fanny (1932 film) 
 Fanny (1961, musical)
 Fanny (2013 film)
 The Fantasticks (1995, musical)
 The Far Cry (1926)
 Far Side of the Moon (2003)
 The Farmer from Texas (1925)
 The Farmer Takes a Wife (1935)
 The Farmer Takes a Wife (1953 film) 
 The Farmer's Daughter (1947 film) 
 The Farmer's Wife (1928)
 Fashions in Love (1929) 
 Fast and Loose (1930 film) 
 Fast and Loose (1954 film)
 Fast Company (1929 film)
 Fast Life (1929 film)
 The Fast Set (1924)
 Father Cigarette (1946 film)
 Father Cigarette (1955 film)
 Father For a Night (1939)
 Father Is a Prince (1940)
 The Father of the Girl (1953)
 A Father Without Knowing It (1932)
 The Fatted Calf (1939)
 Faun (film) (1918)
 Faust (1926 film)
 Faust (1960 film)
 Faust (1994 film)
 Faust (2011 film)
 Faustina (1957 film)
 Fausto 5.0 (2001)
 Fazil (film) (1928)
 Frederica (1932 film) (1932)
 Fedora (1918 film) 
 Fedora (1926 film)
 Feet of Clay (1924 film)
 Felicita Colombo (1937) 
 Feminine Wiles (1951)
 Fences (film) (2016)
 The Fever (2004 film) (TV)
 A Few Good Men (1992)
 Fiddler on the Roof (1971, musical)
 The Field (film) (1990)
 Figaro (film) (1929)
 The Fighting Hope (1915)
 Fighting Odds (1917)
 Filomena Marturano (1951, musical)
 Find the Lady (1936 film)
 Finding Neverland (film) (2004)
 Fine Clothes (1925)
 A Fine Romance (film) (1991)
 Finian's Rainbow (1968, musical)
 The Fire Patrol (1924)
 The Firebird (1934 film) 
 Fires of Fate (1923 film)
 Fires of Fate (1932 film)
 The First Gentleman (1948)
 First Lady (film) (1937)
 First Monday in October (film) (1981)
 The First Mrs. Fraser (1932 film)
 The First Year (1926 film)
 The First Year (1932)
 Fit (2010 film)
 Five Evenings (1978)
 Five Finger Exercise (1962)
 Five Graves to Cairo (1943)
 Five on the Black Hand Side (1973)
 Fixer Dugan (1939)
 The Flag Lieutenant (1926 film)
 The Flag Lieutenant (1932 film)
 The Flame (1926 film)
 The Flame (1936 film)
 The Flame (1952 film)
 Flame in the Streets (1961)
 Flamingo Road (film) (1949)
 Flapper Wives (1924)
 A Flea in Her Ear (film) (1968)
 The Fleet's In (1942)
 Flesh and Blood (1951 film)
 The Flight (film) (1970)
 The Flight in the Night (1926)
 Flirtation (1927 film) (1927)
 Floretta and Patapon (1913 film)
 Floretta and Patapon (1927 film)
 A Florida Enchantment (1914)
 Floride (film) (2015)
 Flower Drum Song (1961, musical)
 Flying Down to Rio (1933)
 Fog Island (1937)
 Folies Bergère de Paris (1935)
 Follow Me! (1972 film)
 Follow the Fleet (1936)
 Follow Thru (1930)
 The Fool (1925 film)
 Fool for Love (1985)
 A Fool There Was (1915 film)
 A Foolish Maiden (1929)
 Fools Rush In (1949 film)
 Footsteps (film) (2003, TV)
 Footsteps in the Dark (film) (1941)
 For Colored Girls (2010)
 For colored girls who have considered suicide/when the rainbow is enuf (Television) (1982)
 For Heaven's Sake (1950 film) 
 For Men Only (1960 film)
 For the Defense (1922 film) 
 For the Love of Mike (1932 film)
 For Wives Only (1926)
 Forbidden Paradise (1924)
 Forever Female (1953)
 Forever Plaid: The Movie (2008)
 Forgotten Melody for a Flute (1987)
 The Forgotten Pistolero (1969)
 The Former Mattia Pascal (1937)
 The Fornaretto of Venice (1939)
 Fortunato (film) (1942)
 Fortune and Men's Eyes (1971)
 The Fortune Hunter (1914 film)
 The Fortune Hunter (1920 film)
 The Fortune Hunter (1927 film)
 Forty Winks (1925 film)
 Four (2012 film)
 Four Hours to Kill! (1935)
 The Four Masked Men (1934)
 The Four Poster (1952 film) 
 Four Walls (film) (1928)
 Four White Shirts (1967)
 Foxfire (1987 film)
 Frankenstein (1931 film) 
 Frankie and Johnny (1991 film)
 Fräulein Veronika (1936)
 Freak (film)
 A Free Soul (1931)
 Free and Easy (1941 film) 
 Freedom of the Seas (film) (1934)
 French Leave (1930 film)
 French Leave (1937 film)
 A French Mistress (1960)
 Freshman Love (1936)
 Fric-Frac (1939)
 Friend of the World (2020)
 Friendly Enemies (1925 film)
 Friendly Enemies (1942)
 Friends (1988 film)
 Friends and Neighbours (1959)
 The Frightened Lady (1932 film)
 The Frisky Mrs. Johnson (1921)
 Frøken Kirkemus (1941)
 From Hell to Heaven (1933)
 From Morn to Midnight (1920)
 The Front Page (1931)
 The Front Page (1974)
 Frost/Nixon (2008)
 The Fugitive Kind (1960)
 Fun (film) (1994)
 Fun in the Barracks (1932)
 Funny Girl (1968, musical)
 Funny Money (2006 film)
 A Funny Thing Happened on the Way of the Forum (1966, musical)
 The Furies (1930 film)

G 
 Il gabbiano (1977) 
 Gaby (film) (1956)
 The Gaieties of the Squadron (1913)
 Galileo (1975 film) 
 The Galley Slave (1915)
 A Gamble in Lives (1920)
 Gambling (film) (1934)
 The Gamblers (1929 film)
 The Garden of Eden (1928 film)
 The Garden of Weeds (1924)
 Gaslight (1940)
 Gaslight (1944)
 Gastone (film) (1960)
 The Gay Adventure (1936)
 The Gay Deceiver (1926)
 The Gay Lord Quex (1917 film)
 The Gazebo (1959)
 Gebo and the Shadow (2012)
 Geliebte Hochstaplerin (1961)
 General John Regan (1933 film)
 General Post (1920)
 Get Off My Foot (1935)
 The Gentle Gunman (1952, TV)
 A Gentleman in Tails (1931)
 A Gentleman of Leisure (1915 film)
 A Gentleman of Leisure (1923 film)
 Gentlemen of the Press (1929)
 A Gentleman of the Ring (1926 film)
 A Gentleman of the Ring (1932 film)
 Gentlemen Prefer Blondes (1953)
 The Gentleman Without a Residence (1915 film)
 The Gentleman Without a Residence (1934 film)
 George Washington Jr. (film) (1924)
 George Washington Slept Here (1942)
 Gertrud (film) (1964)
 Get Off My Foot (1935)
 Get Real (film) (1998)
 Get Your Man (1927 film)
 Get Your Man (1934 film)
 Getting Gertie's Garter (1927 film)
 Getting Gertie's Garter (1945)
 The Ghost Breaker (1914 film)
 The Ghost Breaker (1922 film)
 The Ghost Breakers (1940)
 The Ghost Comes Home (1940)
 The Ghost Talks (1929 film)
 Ghosts (1915 film)
 Ghosts – Italian Style (1967)
 Ghost Ship (1952 film)
 Ghost Train (1927 film)
 The Ghost Train (1931 film)
 The Ghost Train (1941 film)
 Ghost Train International (1976)
 Ghosts (1915 film) 
 The Ghoul (1933 film)
 Gideon (play) (TV)
 Gigi (1958)
 The Gin Game (1981, TV)
 Ginger Ale Afternoon (1989)
 The Girl and the Boy (1931)
 The Girl and the Gambler (1939)
 Girl Crazy (1932 film) (1932, musical)
 Girl Crazy (1943 film) (1943, musical)
 Girl from Avenue A (1940)
 The Girl from 10th Avenue (1935)
 The Girl from Barnhelm (1940)
 The Girl from Maxim's (1933, musical)
 The Girl from Maxim's (1950 film) (1950)
 The Girl in the Limousine (1924)
 The Girl in the Show (1929)
 The Girl Irene (1936)
 The Girl of the Golden West (1915 film) 
 The Girl of the Golden West (1923 film) 
 The Girl of the Golden West (1930 film) 
 The Girl of the Golden West (1938 film) (musical)
 Girl of the Rio (1932, musical)
 The Girl on the Train (2009 film)
 The Girl Who Forgot (1940)
 The Girl Who Had Everything (1953)
 Girls (1919 film) 
 The Girls (1968 film) 
 Girls at Sea (1958 film)
 Girls' Dormitory (1936)
 Girls in Uniform (1951 film)
 Give Me a Sailor (1938)
 Give Me Your Heart (film) (1936)
 The Glad Eye (1920 film)
 The Glad Eye (1927 film)
 Glad Tidings (film) (1953)
 The Glass Menagerie (1950 film)
 The Glass Menagerie (1966 film) (TV)
 The Glass Menagerie (1973 film) (TV)
 The Glass Menagerie (1987 film) 
 A Glass of Water (1923 film)
 A Glass of Water (1960 film)
 A Glass of Water (1979 film) (TV)
 The Glembays (1988)
 Glengarry Glen Ross (1992)
 Glorious Betsy (1928)
 Go West, Young Man (1936)
 God's Gift to Women (1931)
 Godspell (1973, musical)
 Goetz von Berlichingen (film) (1955)
 Going Crooked (1926)
 Going Places (1938 film)
 Going Wild (1930)
 The Gold Diggers (1923 film) 
 Gold Diggers of Broadway (1929, musical)
 Gold Diggers of 1933 (1933, musical)
 Golda's Balcony (2019 film) 
 Golden Boy (film) (1939)
 Golden Dawn (film) (1930, musical)
 Gone Are the Days! (1963)
 Good and Naughty (1926)
 The Good Companions (1933 film)
 The Good Earth (film) (1937)
 The Good Fairy (1935 film) (1935)
 Good Gracious, Annabelle (1919)
 A Good Little Devil (1914)
 Good Night, Paul (1918)
 The Good Old Soak (1937)
 The Good Fairy (1935 film) (1935)
 A Good Woman (film) (2004)
 Goodbye Again (1933 film) 
 Goodbye Charlie (1964)
 The Goodbye Girl (1977)
 Goodbye Mr. Loser (2015)
 Goodbye, My Fancy (1951)
 The Goodbye People (film) (1984)
 Goodbye Youth (1918 film) 
 Goodbye Youth (1927 film)
 Goodbye Youth (1927 film)
 The Gorgon (1942 film) 
 The Gorilla (1927 film)
 The Gorilla (1930 film)
 The Gorilla (1939 film) 
 The Gospel According to the Blues (2010)
 La governante (1974)
 The Governor's Lady (1915 film) 
 The Grand Duchess and the Waiter (1926)
 Grande École (film) (2004)
 Grand Hotel (1932 film) 
 Grand National Night (1953)
 Grandstand for General Staff (1926 film)
 Grandstand for General Staff (1953 film)
 Grease (1978, musical)
 Great Catherine (film) (1968)
 Great Day (1945 film)
 The Great Divide (1915 film)
 The Great Divide (1925 film)
 The Great Divide (1929 film)
 The Great Game (1953 film)
 The Great Garrick (1937)
 The Great Well (1924) 
 The Great White Hope (film) (1970)
 The Greeks Had a Word for Them (1932)
 The Green Goddess (1923 film) 
 The Green Goddess (1930 film)
 The Green Jacket (1937)
 The Green Man (film) (1956)
 The Green Pack (1934)
 The Green Pastures (film) (1936)
 The Green Goddess (1923 film)
 The Green Goddess (1930 film)
 The Green Man (film) (1956)
 The Green Pastures (film) (1936)
 Gretna Green (1915 film)
 Grimaldi (film) (1914)
 The Grip of Iron (1920)
 Den grønne heisen (1981)
 Grumpy (1923 film) 
 Die Gstettensaga: The Rise of Echsenfriedl (2014, TV)
 The Guardsman (1925 film)
 The Guardsman (1931)
 Guess Who's Sleeping in My Bed? (1973, TV)
 The Guilty Man (1918)
 Guilty of Love (film) (1920)
 The Guinea Pig (film) (1948) 
 A Gust of Wind (1942)
 Guys and Dolls (1955, musical)
 Gypsy (1962, musical)
 Gypsy (1993, musical, TV)

H 
 Habit (1921 film)
 Half a Sinner (1934 film)
 Half a Sixpence (film) (1967, musical)
 Hair (1979, musical)
 Hairspray (2007, musical)
 The Hairy Ape (film) (1944)
 The Haller Case (1933)
 Hamlet (1948)
 Hamlet (1964)
 Hamlet (1969)
 Hamlet (1990)
 Hamlet (1996)
 Hamlet (2009 film) (TV)
 Handy Andy (1934 film)
 The Hanging Judge (film) (1918)
 Hangman's Noose (1940)
 Hannele's Journey to Heaven (1922)
 Hanneles Himmelfahrt (film) (1934)
 The Happiest Days of Your Life (1950)
 The Happiest Millionaire (1967, musical)
 The Happiness of Three Women (1954)
 Happy Anniversary (1959 film) 
 Happy Birthday, Wanda June (1971)
 The Happy Ending (1925 film)
 The Happy Family (1952 film)
 Happy Go Lucky (1946 film)
 Happy Is the Bride (1958)
 The Happy Time (1952)
 The Happy Village (1955)
 Harakiri (1919 film)
 The Harbour Lights (1914 film) 
 Harriet Craig (1950)
 Harvey (1950)
 Hashtag Roxy (2018)
 The Hasty Heart (1949)
 The Hatchet Man (1932)
 A Hatful of Rain (1957)
 Hawthorne of the U.S.A. (1919)
 He Couldn't Say No (1938)
 He Stayed for Breakfast (1940)
 He Who Gets Slapped (1924)
 Head of a Tyrant (1959)
 Head over Heels (1937 film)
 Heading for Heaven (1947)
 The Headmaster (film) (1921)
 The Heart of a Hero (1916)
 Heart of Gold (1941 film)
 The Heart of Maryland (1915 film) 
 The Heart of Maryland (1921 film) 
 The Heart of Maryland (1927)
 Heart of the Sun (1998)
 Hearts Divided (1936, musical)
 Hearts of Oak (film) (1924)
 Heat Lightning (film) (1934)
 Heaven Can Wait (1943 film) 
 Heaven Can Wait (1978 film) 
 Heaven in the Dark (2016)
 Hedda Gabler (1920 film)
 Hedda Gabler (1925 film) 
 Hedda (film) (1975)
 Hedda Gabler (2004 film)
 Hedda Gabler (2016 film)
 Hedwig and the Angry Inch (2001, musical)
 The Heidi Chronicles (film) (1995, TV)
 Heimat (1938 film) (1938)
 The Heiress (1949)
 Held by the Enemy (film) (1920)
 The Hellcat (1928)
 Hello Again (2017 film) 
 Hello, Dolly! (1969, musical)
 Hello, I'm Your Aunt! (1975)
 Hello, Sweetheart (1935)
 Henry IV (film) (1984)
 Her Cardboard Lover (1942)
 Her Final Role (1946)
 Her First Affaire (1932)
 Her First Mate (1933)
 Her Gilded Cage (1922)
 Her Great Match (1915)
 Her Imaginary Lover (1933)
 Her Last Affaire (1935)
 Her Luck in London (1914)
 Her Master's Voice (1936)
 Her Own Way (1915)
 Her Private Life (1929)
 Her Redemption (1924)
 Her Reputation (1931)
 Her Temporary Husband (1923)
 Her Sister from Paris (1925)
 Her Wedding Night (1930)
 Hercules Unchained (1959)
 Here Comes Mr. Jordan (1941)
 Here Comes the Bride (1919 film) 
 Here is My Heart (1934, musical)
 The Hero (1923 film) 
 Herr Puntila and His Servant Matti (1960 film)
 Herra Lahtinen lähtee lipettiin (1939)
 Der Herrscher (1937)
 The Hide (2008)
 Hideaway (1937 film) 
 High and Low (1933 film)
 High Life (2009 film)
 High Pressure (film) (1932)
 High Society (1956, musical)
 High Tor (play) (1950) (see 1956 TV musical)
 High Treason (1929 British film) 
 High Wall (1947)
 Hilda Crane (1956)
 The Hill (film) (1965)
 Hills of Peril (1927)
 Him and His Sister (1931)
 Himmeluret (1925)
 Hindle Wakes (1918 film)
 Hindle Wakes (1927)
 Hindle Wakes (1931 film)
 Hindle Wakes (1952 film)
 His Double Life (1933)
 His Family Tree (1935)
 His Girl Friday (1940)
 His Glorious Night (1929)
 His House in Order (1920 film) 
 His Lordship (1936 film)
 His Lordship Regrets (1938)
 His Majesty, Bunker Bean (1925 film) 
 His Royal Highness (1932 film)
 His Tiger Lady (1928)
 His Wife's Lover (1931, musical)
 His Wife's Mother (1932 film)
 Historia de una noche (1941)
 Hit the Deck (1930 film) (1930, musical)
 Hit the Deck (1955 film) (1955, musical)
 The History Boys (film) (2005)
 Hobson's Choice (1920 film)
 Hobson's Choice (1931 film)
 Hobson's Choice (1954 film)
 Hocuspocus (1930 film)
 Hocuspocus (1953 film)
 Hocuspocus (1966 film)
 Hold My Hand (film) (1938, musical)
 A Hole in the Head (1959)
 A Hole in the Wall (1930 film)
 A Hole in the Wall (1950 film)
 The Hole in the Wall (1921 film)
 Holiday (1930)
 Holiday (1931 film) 
 Holiday (1938)
 Holiday for Lovers (1959)
 The Holly and the Ivy (film) (1952)
 Homage at Siesta Time (1962)
 Los hombres las prefieren viudas (1943)
 Home at Seven (film) (1952)
 The Home Towners (1928)
 A Home with a View (2019)
 The Homecoming (1973)
 Os Homens São de Marte... E é pra Lá que Eu Vou! (2014)
 The Honey Pot (1967)
 Honeymoon for Three (1941 film) 
 The Honeymoon Machine (1961)
 Honeysuckle (film) (1938)
 Honor of the Family (1931)
 An Honourable Murder (1960)
 Hoodman Blind (1923)
 Hoop-La (1933)
 Horvat’s Choice (1985)
 Hot Spell (film) (1958)
 Hotel Imperial (1927 film)
 Hotel Imperial (1939 film)
 The Hotel Mouse (1923)
 Hotel Paradiso (film) (1966)
 Hotel Imperial (1939 film) 
 Hotel Sorrento (1995)
 The Hottentot (1922 film) 
 The Hottentot (1929)
 The Hour Before My Brother Dies (1986, TV)
 House (1995 film)
 The House by the Sea (1924 film) 
 The House in Montevideo (1951 film)
 The House in Montevideo (1963 film)
 The House of Bernarda Alba (1987 film) 
 The House of Discord (1913)
 The House of Fear (1939 film)
 The House of Lies (1926 film) 
 The House of Peril (1922)
 The House of Rothschild (1934)
 The House of the Arrow (1930 film)
 The House of Yes (1997)
 The House Opposite (1917 film)
 Housemaster (film) (1938)
 How to Be Very, Very Popular (1955)
 How to Marry a Millionaire (1953)
 How to Succeed in Business Without Really Trying (1967, musical)
 A Huey P. Newton Story (2001)
 Huis clos (1954 film)
 Human Hearts (film) (1922)
 The Human Voice (1954)
 The Humming Bird (1924)
 A Hungry Heart (1917)
 Hunting Scenes from Bavaria (1969)
 Hurlyburly (1998)
 Hurrah! I Live! (1928)
 Husband of His Wife (1961)
 The Husbands of Leontine (1947)
 Hyde Park Corner (film) (1935)
 The Hypocrites (1916 film)
 The Hypocrites (1923 film)

I 
 I Am a Camera (film) (1955)
 I cannibali (1970)
 I Confess (film) (1953)
 The I Inside (2003)
 I Killed the Count (1939)
 I Lived with You (1933)
 I Love You, I Love You Not (1996)
 I Loved You Wednesday (1933)
 I Married an Angel (film) (1942, musical)
 I Never Sang for My Father (1970)
 I Remember Mama (film) (1948)
 The Iceman Cometh (The Play of the Week) (1960)
 The Iceman Cometh (1973)
 An Ideal Husband (1947 film)
 An Ideal Husband (1999 film) 
 An Ideal Husband (2000 film)
 The Ides of March (2011 film) 
 Idiot's Delight (film) (1939)
 The Idle Rich (1929 film) 
 The Idol of Paris (1914 film)
 I'd Give My Life (1936)
 If I Were Free (1933)
 If I Were King (1938)
 If I Were for Real (film) (1981)
 If I Were Rich (1936)
 I'm Not Rappaport (film) (1996)
 I'll Be Yours (1947)
 I'll Never Forget You (film) (1951)
 Illicit (film) (1931)
 Illuminata (film) (1998)
 The Imaginary Invalid (film) (1952)
 The Impassive Footman (1932)
 The Importance of Being Earnest (1932 film) 
 The Importance of Being Earnest (1952)
 The Importance of Being Earnest (1957 film) (TV)
 The Importance of Being Earnest (2002 film) (2002)
 The Importance of Being Earnest (2011 film) (TV)
 The Impossible Years (1968)
 The Improper Duchess (1936)
 In Celebration (1975)
 In Hollywood with Potash and Perlmutter (1924)
 In High Places (1943 film)
 In Love with Love (film) (1924)
 In Mizzoura (1919)
 In Old Kentucky (1919 film) 
 In Old Kentucky (1927 film) 
 In Old Kentucky (1935 film) 
 In the Company of Men (1997)
 In the House (film) (2012)
 In the Good Old Summertime (1949, musical)
 In the Line of Duty (1917 film)
 In the Soup (1936 film)
 Inadmissible Evidence (film) (1968)
 Incendies (2010)
 Incident at Vichy (1973, TV) 
 Incognito from St. Petersburg (1977) 
 Indiscreet (1958)
 Infatuation (1925 film) (1925)
 The Inferior Sex (1920)
 Ingeborg (film) (1960)
 Inherit the Wind (1960 film) 
 Inherit the Wind (1988 film) (TV)
 Inherit the Wind (1999 film) (TV)
 The Innkeeper (1944)
 The Innocents (1961 film)
 The Innocents of Chicago (1932)
 Inquest (1931 British film)
 Inquest (1939 film)
 Insects (film) (2018)
 Inside the Lines (1930)
 Insignificance (film) (1985)
 An Inspector Calls (1954 film)
 An Inspector Calls (2015 TV film)
 An Inspector Calls (2015 Hong Kong film)
 The Inspector General (1933 film)
 The Inspector General (1949 film) 
 The Inspector-General (1952)
 Inspector Vargas (1940)
 Instinct (1930 film)
 Interference (film) (1928)
 The Interrupted Honeymoon (1936)
 Intimate Relations (1953 film) 
 Into the Woods (2014, musical)
 Intoxication (film) (1919)
 Intrigue and Love (film) (1959)
 Invitation to the Waltz (film) (1935)
 Iphigenia (film) (1977)
 Irene (1926 film) 
 Iris (1916 film)
 Is Your Honeymoon Really Necessary? (1953)
 Is Zat So? (1927)
 Isle of Missing Men (1942)
 Isn't Anyone Alive? (2012)
 It Happened in New York (1935, musical)
 It Happened in Paris (1935)
 It Happened One Sunday (1944)
 It Happened Tomorrow (1944)
 It Is the Law (1924)
 It Pays to Advertise (1919 film) 
 It Pays to Advertise (1931 film) 
 It's a Boy (film) (1933)
 It's Always the Woman (1916)
 It's Never Too Late (1956 film)
 It Is Never Too Late to Mend (1911 film)
 It's Not My Fault and I Don't Care Anyway (2017)
 It's Only the End of the World (2016)
 It's the Rage (film) (1999)
 The Italian Straw Hat (film) (1928)
 Ivan Vasilievich: Back to the Future (1988)

J 
 Les J3 (1946)
 Jack Goes Boating (film) (2010)
 Jack of All Trades (1936 film) 
 Jack Straw (1920 film) 
 Jack Tar (film) (1915)
 Jacques Brel Is Alive and Well and Living in Paris (film) (1975)
 Jake's Women (1996, TV)
 Jane (1915 film) 
 Janice Meredith (1924, silent)
 Janie (1944 film) 
 Janika (film) (1949)
 The Jazz Singer (1927)
 The Jazz Singer (1952 film) 
 The Jazz Singer (1980)
 Jealousy (1929 film) 
 Jedermann (film) (1961)
 Jeffrey (1995 film) 
 Její pastorkyně (1938)
 Jeannie (film) (1941)
 Jeppe på bjerget (1933 film)
 Jeppe på bjerget (film) (1981)
 Jersey Boys (2014, musical)
 The Jester's Supper (film) (1942)
 Jesus Christ Superstar (1973, musical)
 Jewel Robbery (1932)
 The Jeweller's Shop (film) (1988)
 The Jewess of Toledo (film) (1919)
 Jezebel (film) (1938)
 The Jimmy Show (2001)
 Jo (film) (1971)
 Joan of Arc (1948 film)
 Joan of Arc at the Stake (1954)
 Joe Butterfly (1957)
 John Loves Mary (1949)
 Johnny Belinda (1948 film) 
 Johnny Belinda (1967 film) (TV)
 Jolanta the Elusive Pig (1945)
 Journal of a Crime (1934)
 Journey's End (1930 film) 
 Journey's End (2017 film) 
 Juarez (film) (1939)
 The Judas of Tyrol (1933)
 Judgment at Nuremberg (1961)
 Judith of Bethulia (1914)
 Judy (film) (2019)
 Juliette, or Key of Dreams (1951)
 Julius Caesar (1914 film)
 Julius Caesar (1953 film) 
 Jump (2012)
 June Bride (1948)
 June Moon (film) (1931)
 Jungfer, Sie gefällt mir (1969)
 Die Jungfrau auf dem Dach (1953)
 Junior Miss (film) (1945)
 Jungle Patrol (1948 film) 
 Juno and the Paycock (1930)
 Jupiter's Darling (1955)
 Just a Wife (1920)
 Just a Woman (1918 film) 
 Just a Woman (1925 film) 
 Just Married (1928 film)
 Just My Luck (1933 film)
 Just Suppose (1926)
 Justice (1917 film)

K 
 Kaksi Vihtoria (1939)
 Karin Månsdotter (film) (1954)
 Kathleen Mavourneen (1919 film) 
 Kathleen Mavourneen (1930 film) 
 Katharina Knie (film) (1929)
 Katyar Kaljat Ghusali (2015)
 Kean (1921 film) 
 Kean (1924 film) 
 Kean (1940 film) 
 Kean: Genius or Scoundrel (1956)
 Keane of Kalgoorlie (1911)
 Keep an Eye on Amelia (1949)
 Keepers of Youth (1932)
 The Kentucky Derby (1922 film) 
 Keto and Kote (film) (1948)
 Key Largo (film) (1948)
 Khanuma (1978, TV)
 The Kibitzer (1930)
 Kick In (1917 film) 
 Kick In (1922 film) 
 Kick In (1931 film)
 Kiki (1926 film) 
 Kiki (1931 film)
 Kill Me, Deadly (2015)
 Killer Joe (film) (2011)
 The Killing of a Sacred Deer (2017)
 The Killing of Sister George (film) (1968)
 Killing Zelda Sparks (2008)
 Kind Lady (1935 film) 
 Kind Lady (1951 film)
 The King (1936 film)
 King and Country (1964)
 The King and I (1956, musical)
 The King and I (1999, musical)
 The King and the Clown (2005)
 King Charles III (film) (2017, TV)
 King Dave (2016)
 The King is the Best Mayor (1974)
 The King of Paris (1934 film) (1934)
 King of the Castle (1926 film)
 King of the Hotel (1932)
 King of the Ritz (1933, musical)
 The King on Main Street (1925)
 King Rikki (2002)
 The King Steps Out (1936)
 The King's Jester (1941)
 Kismet (1920 film)
 Kismet (1930 film) 
 Kismet (1931 film)
 Kismet (1944 film) 
 Kismet (musical) (1955, musical)
 Kiss and Make-Up (1934)
 Kiss and Tell (1945 film) 
 The Kiss Before the Mirror (1933)
 A Kiss in a Taxi (1927)
 A Kiss in the Dark (1925 film)
 Kiss Me (1929 film)
 Kiss Me (1932 film)
 Kiss Me Again (1925 film) 
 Kiss Me Again (1931 film) 
 Kiss Me, Stupid (1964)
 Kiss Me, Kate (1953)
 Kiss the Boys Goodbye (1941)
 Kiss Them for Me (film) (1957)
 Kisses for Breakfast (film) (1941)
 Kissing Jessica Stein (2001)
 The Kitchen (1961 film) 
 Klondike Annie (1936)
 Knickerbocker Holiday (film) (1944, musical)
 Knocks at My Door (1994)
 Kongo (1932 film) 
 Kosher Kitty Kelly (1926)
 Krechinsky's Wedding (1953 film) 
 The Kreutzer Sonata (1915 film)
 Kyrsyä – Tuftland (2017)

L 
 Laburnum Grove (1936)
 Lackawanna Blues (2005)
 The Lacquered Box (1932)
 Ladies' Day (1943)
 Ladies in Retirement (1941)
 Ladies in Love (1936)
 Ladies Love Brutes (1930)
 Ladies Must Live (1940 film)
 Ladies of Leisure (1930)
 Ladies of the Jury (1932)
 Ladies Should Listen (1934)
 Ladies They Talk About (1933)
 Ladies' Night in a Turkish Bath (1928)
 Lady Be Careful (1936)
 Lady Be Good (1928 film)
 Lady Gangster (1942)
 Lady in the Dark (1944, musical)
 The Lady in the Van (2015)
 The Lady Is Willing (1934 film)
 The Lady of Scandal (1930)
 The Lady from Trévelez (film) (1936)
 Lady in Ermine (1947)
 A Lady Mislaid (1958)
 Lady Tetley's Decree (1920)
 Lady Windermere's Fan (1925 film) 
 A Lady's Name (1918)
 Lakeboat (2000)
 The Lamb (1915 film) 
 The Lambeth Walk (film) (1938, musical)
 The Lame Devil (film) (1948)
 The Land of Promise (1917)
 Landslide (1940 film)
 Lantana (film) (2001)
 The Laramie Project (2002)
 Larceny, Inc. (1942)
 The Lark (play) (1957, see TV adaptation)
 The Lark (1959 film)
 The Lash (1934 film)
 The Last Chance (1937 film)
 The Last Five Years (2014, musical)
 The Last Mile (1932 film) 
 The Last Mile (1959 film) 
 The Last Night (1949 film)
 The Last of Mrs. Cheyney (1929 film) 
 The Last of Mrs. Cheyney (1937 film)
 Last of the Mobile Hot Shots (1970)
 Last of the Red Hot Lovers (film) (1972)
 The Last Shot You Hear (1969)
 The Last Warning (1928)
 The Late Edwina Black (1951)
 The Late George Apley (film) (1947)
 Latin Quarter (1945 film)
 Laugh, Clown, Laugh (1928)
 The Laughing Lady (1929 film)
 Laughing Sinners (1931)
 The Laughter of Fools (1933)
 Laughter on the 23rd Floor (2001, TV)
 The Law and the Lady (1951 film) (1951)
 The Law and the Woman (1922)
 The Law of the Land (film) (1917)
 Law of the Underworld (1938)
 Lawful Larceny (play), Lawful Larceny (1923 film), Lawful Larceny (1930 film)
 Lazybones (1925 film) 
 The Lay of the Land (film) (1997)
 Leathernecking (1930)
 Leave It to Me (1933 film)
 Leave It to Smith (1933)
 Leaving (2011 film)
 Leaving Metropolis (2002)
 The Legend of 1900 (1998)
 The Legend of Faust (1949)
 The Leghorn Hat (1939)
 Lenny (1974)
 Leo the Last (1970)
 Leontine's Husbands (1928)
 The Leopard Lady (1928)
 Let Me Explain, Dear (1932)
 Let Us Be Gay (1930)
 Let's Be Happy (1947)
 Let's Do It Again (1953 film) 
 Let's Face It (film) (1943)
 Let's Get a Divorce (1918)
 Let's Get Married (1926 film) 
 Let's Get Married (1931 film)
 Let's Love and Laugh (1931)
 Let's Make a Night of It (1937, musical)
 The Letter (1929) 
 The Letter (1940)
 Libahunt (1968)
 Libel (film) (1959)
 The Libertine (2000 film) 
 The Libertine (2004 film)
 Liberty Hall (film) (1914)
 The Lie (1918 film)
 Liebelei (film) (1933)
 Life (1928 film)
 Life Begins (film) (1932)
 Life Begins at Eight-Thirty (1942)
 Life for Ruth (1962)
 A Life in the Theatre (1979 film)
 A Life in the Theatre (1993 film)
 The Life Line (1919)
 Life of Riley (2014 film)
 Life of an Expert Swordsman (1959)
 Life With Father (1947)
 Light Up the Sky! (film) (1960)
 Lightnin' (1925 film)
 Lightnin' (1930 film)
 Lights of London (1914 film)
 Lights of London (1923 film)
 Like the Leaves (1935)
 Lilac Time (1928 film)
 Lili (1918 film)
 Lilies (film) (1996)
 Lilies of the Field (1924 film) 
 Lilies of the Field (1930 film) 
 Liliom (1930 film) 
 Liliom (1934 film)
 Lilly Turner (1933)
 Lily in Love (1984)
 Lily of Killarney (1929 film) 
 Lily of Killarney (1934 film) 
 Lily of the Dust (1924)
 The Limping Man (1936 film)
 The Lincoln Highwayman (1919)
 Liolà (film) (1963)
 The Lion and the Mouse (1914 film)
 The Lion and the Mouse (1919 film)
 The Lion and the Mouse (1928 film) 
 The Lion in Winter (1968 film) 
 The Lion in Winter (2003 film) (TV)
 The Lioness of Castille (1951)
 Lip Service (1988)
 The Little Accident (1930)
 Little Accident (film) (1939)
 A Little Bit of Fluff (1919 film) 
 A Little Bit of Fluff (1928 film)
 The Little Cafe (1919 film)
 The Little Cafe (1931 film) 
 The Little Clown (1921)
 The Little Foxes (1941)
 The Little Hut (1957)
 Little Johnny Jones (1923 film)
 Little Johnny Jones (1929 film)
 A Little Journey (1927)
 Little Malcolm (1974)
 The Little Minister (1934 film) 
 Little Miss Nobody (1923 film)
 Little Murders (1971)
 Little Nellie Kelly (1940)
 A Little Night Music (1977, musical)
 Little Old New York (1923 film)
 Little Old New York (1940)
 Little Shop of Horrors (1986, musical)
 Little Voice (film) (1998)
 The Littlest Rebel (1935)
 The Living Corpse (1929 film) 
 Living Dangerously (film) (1936)
 Living It Up (1954)
 La locandiera (film) (1980)
 The Locked Door (1929)
 Lola Leaves for the Ports (1947)
 Lola the Coalgirl (1952, musical)
 Lock Up Your Daughters (1969 film)
 London by Night (film) (1937)
 London Suite (1996, TV)
 Lonelyhearts (1958)
 The Long and the Short and the Tall (film) (1961)
 Long Day's Journey Into Night (1962)
 The Long Intermission (1927)
 The Long Voyage Home (1940)
 Look Back in Anger (1959 film) 
 Look Back in Anger (1980 film) (TV)
 Looking Forward (1933 film) (1933)
 Loot (1970 film)
 Lord Babs (1932)
 Lord Camber's Ladies (1932)
 Lorenzaccio (film) (1951)
 Lost: A Wife (1925)
 Lost in the Stars (film) (1974)
 Lost in Yonkers (1993)
 Lost Kisses (1945 film)
 A Lost Letter (film) (1953)
 The Lottery Man (1919 film) 
 Love '47 (1949)
 Love and Kisses (film) (1965)
 Love and Fear (film) (1988)
 Love and Human Remains (1993)
 Love at First Child (2015)
 The Love Ban (1973)
 The Love Captive (1934)
 Love Comes Along (1930)
 Love Lies (1932 film)
 The Love Contract (1932)
 The Love Doctor (1929)
 Love 'Em and Leave 'Em (film) (1926)
 Love from a Stranger (1937 film)
 Love from a Stranger (1947 film) 
 The Love Habit (1931)
 Love, Honor, and Oh Baby! (1933)
 Love in a Wood (1915)
 Love Is All There Is (1996)
 Love, Live and Laugh (1929)
 Love Letters (1999 film) (TV)
 Love Me Tonight (1932, musical)
 The Love of Sunya (1927)
 The Love Race (1931)
 Love Songs (1930 film)
 A Love Story (1933 film)
 Love Under Fire (1937) 
 Love! Valour! Compassion! (1997)
 Love Watches (1918)
 Love's a Luxury (1952)
 Love's Carnival (1930 film)
 Love Watches (1918)
 Love's Whirlpool (2014 film)
 The Lovable Cheat (1949)
 The Lover of Camille (1924)
 Lovers (1927 film) (1927)
 Lovers and Other Strangers (1970)
 Lovers' Lane (1924 film) 
 Lovers in Quarantine (1925)
 The Loves of Letty (1919)
 Lovin' the Ladies (1930)
 The Lower Depths (1936 film)  
 The Lower Depths (1957 film) 
 Loyalties (1933 film)
 Luck of the Navy (1938)
 The Luck of the Navy (film) (1927)
 The Luck of Roaring Camp (1911 film)
 A Lucky Man (1930)
 Lucky to Me (1939)
 Luise Millerin (1922)
 Lulu (1917 film) 
 Lulu (1962 film) 
 Lulu Belle (film) (1948, musical)
 Lulu by Night (1986)
 Lumpaci the Vagabond (1936, musical)
 The Lure (1914 film) 
 The Lure of London (1914)
 Luther (1974 film)
 Luv (film) (1967)
 Lydia Gilmore (1915)
 The Lyons Mail (1916 film)
 The Lyons Mail (1931)

M 
 M. Butterfly (film) (1993)
 Macbeth (2015)
 The Mad Genius (1931)
 Mad Love (2001 film)
 The Mad Room (1969)
 Madame (1961 film) (1961)
 Madame Butterfly (1915 film) 
 Madame Butterfly (1932 film) 
 Madame Butterfly (1954 film) 
 Madame Louise (1951)
 Madame Sans-Gêne (1911 film)
 Madame Sans-Gêne (1925 film) 
 Madame X (1929 film) 
 Madame X (1955 film) 
 Madame X (1966 film) 
 Madame X (1981 film) 
 Das Mädchen vom Pfarrhof (1955)
 Mädchen in Uniform (1931)
 Mädchen in Uniform (1958 film)
 Maddalena, Zero for Conduct (1940)
 Madea's Big Happy Family (film) (2011)
 A Madea Christmas (film) (2013)
 Madea Goes to Jail (2009)
 Madea's Family Reunion (2006)
 Mademoiselle Gobete (1952)
 Mademoiselle Josette, My Woman (1926 film)
 Mademoiselle Josette, My Woman (1933 film)
 Mademoiselle Josette, My Woman (1950 film)
 Mademoiselle ma mère (1937)
 Mademoiselle Modiste (film) (1926)
 Madness for Love (1948)
 The Madness of King George (1994)
 The Madwoman of Chaillot (film) (1969)
 Magda Expelled (1938)
 Maggie Pepper (1919)
 The Magic Flame (1927)
 The Magic Flute (2006 film) (2006)
 Magic Waltz (1918)
 The Magistrate (1921 film) 
 The Magnificent Cuckold (1964)
 The Magnificent Yankee (1950 film) 
 The Magnificent Yankee (1965 film)
 The Maid of the Mountains (film) (1932)
 Maids (film) (2001)
 The Maids (film) (1975)
 La Maison du Bonheur (2006)
 Maître après Dieu (1951)
 The Major and the Minor (1942)
 Major Barbara (film) (1941)
 A Majority of One (film) (1961)
 Make Me a Star (film) (1932)
 Make Mine Mink 1960)
 Make Way for Tomorrow (1937)
 Maku ga Agaru (2015)
 Il malato immaginario (1979)
 Male and Female (1919)
 The Male Animal (1942)
 Malvaloca (1926 film)
 Malvaloca (1942 film)
 Malvaloca (1954 film)
 Mama, I Want to Sing! (film) (2009)
 Mama's Affair (1921)
 Mame (1974)
 Mamma Mia! (2008, musical)
 Mammy (film) (1930)
 The Man at Midnight (1931)
 Man, Beast and Virtue (1953)
 A Man for All Seasons (1966 film)
 The Man from Home (1914 film)
 The Man from Home (1922 film)
 The Man from Mexico (1914) 
 The Man in Evening Clothes (1931)
 The Man in Half Moon Street (1945)
 The Man in Possession (1931)
 The Man in the Glass Booth (1975)
 Man of La Mancha (1972)
 A Man of Sorrow (1916)
 Man's Castle (1933)
 A Man's World (1918 film)
 The Man Who Broke the Bank at Monte Carlo (film) (1935)
 The Man Who Came Back (1931 film) 
 The Man Who Came to Dinner (1942 film) 
 The Man Who Came to Dinner (1972 film) (TV)
 The Man Who Changed His Name (1928 film)
 The Man Who Could Cheat Death (1959)
 The Man Who Forgot (1919 film)
 The Man Who Loved Redheads (1955)
 The Man Who Murdered (1931)
 The Man Who Played God (1932 film) (1932)
 The Man with Two Faces (1934 film) (1934)
 The Mandrake (1965 film)
 Mangeuses d'Hommes (1988)
 Mandingo (film) (1975)
 Many Waters (film) (1931)
 The Marathon Family (1982)
 Marat/Sade (film) (1967)
 Marcella (film) (1937)
 Margin for Error (1943)
 Marie and Bruce (2004)
 Marie Tudor (1912 film) 
 Marigold (1938 film)
 Marika (film) (1938)
 The Marionettes (film) (1918)
 Marius (1931 film) 
 Marius (2013 film) 
 Marjorie Prime (2017)
 The Marriage Circle (1924)
 The Marriage-Go-Round (film) (1961)
 Marriage Italian Style (1964)
 The Marriage Maker (1923)
 The Marriage of Figaro (1920 film) 
 The Marriage of Figaro (1949 film) 
 The Marriage of Figaro (1960 film) (TV)
 The Marriage of Kitty (1915)
 The Marriage of Mademoiselle Beulemans (1927 film)
 Married Life (1921 film)
 Marry the Girl (1935 film)
 Marty (film) (1955)
 Martyr (film) (1927)
 Marvin's Room (film) (1996) 
 Mary Magdalene (1914 film) 
 Mary, Mary (film) (1963)
 Mary of Scotland (film) (1936)
 The Masked Woman (1927)
 The Masquerader (1933 film) 
 The Masqueraders (film) (1915)
 Mass Appeal (film) (1984)
 The Master and His Servants (1959)
 A Master Builder (2013)
 Master Harold...and the Boys (1985)
 Master Harold...and the Boys (2010 film) 
 The Master Mind (1920 film) 
 Master of the House (1925)
 Mateo (1937 film) 
 The Matchmaker (1958 film) 
 The Mating Season (film) (1951)
 Matrimonial Agency (1953 film)
 The Matrimonial Bed (1930)
 Matroni and Me (1999)
 May Blossom (film) (1915)
 May Nights (1952)
 Maybe It's Love (1930)
 The Mayor (1997 film)
 The Mayor of Zalamea (1920 film)
 The Mayor of Zalamea (1954 film)
 Maytime (1923 film)
 Maytime (1937 film)
 Me and the Colonel (1958)
 The Meanest Man in the World(1943)
 Medea (1988 film) (TV)
 Médée (2001 film) (TV)
 The Medicine Man (1930 film) 
 A media luz los tres (1958)
 Meet Joe Black (1998)
 Meet Me Tonight (1952)
 Meet Mr. Lucifer (1953)
 Meet the Browns (film) (2008)
 The Meeting Point (1989)
 Mélo (1986 film)
 Melody Lane (1929 film) 
 The Melody Man (1930, musical)
 The Melting Pot (film) (1915)
 Melvin Goes to Dinner (2003)
 The Member of the Wedding (film) (1952)
 A Memory of Two Mondays (film) (1971, TV)
 Memories of Murder (2003)
 Men and Women (1925 film) 
 Men Are Like That (1930)
 Men in White (1934 film)
 Men Must Fight (1933)
 The Men Who Tread on the Tiger's Tail (1945)
 Merely Mary Ann (1931)
 The Merchant of Venice (1916 film)
 The Merchant of Venice (2004 film)
 Merrily We Live (1938)
 The Merry-Go-Round (film) (1920)
 The Merry Vineyard (1927 film) 
 The Merry Vineyard (1952 film) 
 The Merry Wives of Windsor (1965 film)
 Merton of the Movies (1924 film) 
 Merton of the Movies (1947 film) 
 A Message from Mars (1913 film)
 The Messenger (1937 film)
 The Method (film) (2005)
 Metti, una sera a cena (1969)
 Mexican Hayride (1948)
 Mice and Men (film) (1916)
 Miche (film) (1932)
 Mickey Magnate (1949)
 Mickybo and Me (2004)
 Middle Age Spread (1979)
 Middle of the Night (1959)
 The Middle Watch (1930 film)
 The Middle Watch (1940 film)
 A Midnight Bell (1921)
 Midnight Lace (1960)
 Midnight Mystery (1930)
 The Midshipmaid (1932)
 Midsummer Night's Fire (1939)
 The Mighty Barnum (1934)
 Milestones (1916 film)
 The Milky Way (1936 film)
 Le Million (1931)
 A Million Bid (1914 film)
 A Million Bid (1927)
 The Millionairess (1960)
 Minha Mãe é uma Peça (2013)
 Miquette (1934 film)
 Miquette (1940 film)
 Miquette (1950 film)
 The Miracle (1912 film)
 The Miracle (1959 film) 
 The Miracle Child (1932)
 The Miracle Man (1919 film)
 The Miracle Man (1932 film)
 The Miracle Woman (1931)
 The Miracle Worker (1962 film) 
 Miranda (1948 film)
 Miranda (1985 film) 
 The Misanthrope (1974 film) (TV)
 Mischief (1931 film)
 Mischievous Susana (1945)
 The Miser (1990 film)
 Les Misérables (2012, musical)
 Miska the Magnate (1916)
 The Misleading Lady (1916 film)
 The Misleading Lady (1920 film)
 The Misleading Lady (1932 film) 
 Miss Bluebeard (1925)
 Miss Brewster's Millions (1926)
 Miss Firecracker (1989)
 Miss Julie (1922 film) 
 Miss Julie (1951 film) 
 Miss Julie (1999 film) 
 Miss Julie (film) (2014)
 Miss Lulu Bett (film) (1921)
 Miss Rose White (1992, TV)
 Miss Tatlock's Millions (1948)
 Mister Roberts (1955)
 Mister Roberts (1984, TV)
 Mistigri (film) (1931)
 Mistress Nell (1915)
 Mixed Doubles (1933 film)
 The Model Husband (1937 film)
 The Model Husband (1956 film)
 The Model Husband (1959 film)
 A Modern Magdalen (1915)
 The Moment Before (1916)
 Money (1921 film)
 Mogambo (1953)
 The Moment Before (1916)
 The Monk and the Woman (1917)
 The Monk from Santarem (1924)
 Monna Vanna (1922 film)
 Monsieur Brotonneau (1939)
 Monsieur de Pourceaugnac (film) (1985)
 Monsieur Hector (1940)
 Monsieur Lazhar (2011)
 Monsoon (1952 film)
 The Monster (1925 film) 
 Monster in a Box (1991)
 Monster Mash (1995 film) 
 Monte Cristo (1922 film) 
 The Moon Is Blue (1953)
 Moon Over Miami (film) (1941)
 Moonlight (2016 film) 
 Moonlight and Honeysuckle (1921)
 Moonlight and Valentino (1995)
 The Moorish Queen (1937 film)
 Morena Clara (1954)
 Morning Departure (1950)
 Morning Glory (1933 film) 
 Morning's at Seven (1982, see TV productions)
 Morocco (film) (1930)
 The Moth and the Flame (1915 film) 
 Mother (1914 film) 
 Mother (1937 film)
 Mother Carey's Chickens (film) (1938)
 Mother Courage and Her Children (1961)
 Mournful Unconcern (1987)
 Mourning Becomes Electra (film) (1947)
 The Mouthpiece (1932)
 Mouthpiece (film) (2018)
 Mr. Imperium (1951)
 Mr. Music (1950)
 Mr. Pim Passes By (film) (1921)
 Mr. Topaze (1961)
 Mr. Sycamore (1975)
 Mr. What's-His-Name? (1935)
 Mr. Wu (1919 film)
 Mrs. Dane's Defense (1918 film) (1918)
 Mrs. Dane's Defence (1933 film)
 Mrs. Gibbons' Boys (film) (1962)
 Mrs. Warren's Profession (film) (1960)
 Mrs. Wiggs of the Cabbage Patch (1914 film)
 Mrs. Wiggs of the Cabbage Patch (1919 film) 
 Mrs. Wiggs of the Cabbage Patch (1934 film)
 Mrs. Wiggs of the Cabbage Patch (1942 film)
 Much Ado About Nothing (2012 film) 
 Muhammad bin Tughluq (1971)
 Mumsie (1927)
 Murder by the Clock (1931)
 Music in the Air (film) (1934)
 Murder in the Cathedral (1951 film)
 Murder in the Private Car (1934)
 Murder on the Second Floor (1932)
 Murder Without Crime (1951)
 The Music Man (1962, musical)
 The Music Man (2003, TV musical)
 The Music Master (1927 film) (1927)
 My Best Friend's Wife (1998)
 My Bill (1938)
 My Boy Jack (film) (2007, TV)
 My Cousin from Warsaw (film) (1931)
 My Fair Lady (1964, musical)
 My Life with Caroline (1941)
 My Night with Reg (film) (1996)
 My Old Dutch (1926 film) 
 My Old Dutch (1934 film)
 My Old Lady (film) (2014)
 My Sin (1934)
 My Sister and I (1929 film)
 My Sister Eileen (1942 film) 
 My Sister Eileen (1955 film) 
 My Wife's Teacher (1930)
 My Wild Irish Rose (1922)
 The Mystery of Oberwald (1980)
 Mystery Submarine (1963 film)

N 
 Naked Boys Singing! (film) (2007)
 The Naked Man (1923 film)
 The Naked Truth (1914 film)
 Nathan the Wise (film) (1922)
 The National Health (film) (1973)
 Naughty Marietta (film) (1935)
 Neapolitan Turk (1953)
 Neil Simon's I Ought to Be in Pictures (1982)
 Nell (1994)
 Nemo's Bank (1934)
 The Net (1923 film) (1923)
 Never Say Die (1939 film) 
 Never Say Goodbye (1956 film) 
 Never Steal Anything Small (1959)
 Never Take Sweets from a Stranger (1960)
 Never Too Late (1965 film) 
 New Faces (1954)
 The New Gentlemen (1929)
 New Moon (1940 film) (1940, musical) 
 New Morals for Old (1932)
 The New York Idea (1920 film) 
 New York Nights (1929)
 Niagara Motel (2005)
 Nice Girl? (1941)
 Nice People (film) (1922)
 Nicole and Her Virtue (1932)
 Night Alone (1938)
 The Night Before the Divorce (1942)
 The Night Belongs to Us (1929)
 The Night Club Queen (1934)
 Night Court (film) (1932)
 Night Inn (1947)
 The Night Is Ours (1930 film)
 The Night Is Ours (1953 film)
 A Night Like This (film) (1932)
 'night, Mother (1986)
 Night Must Fall (1937 film) 
 Night Must Fall (1964 film) 
 A Night of Adventure (1944)
 The Night of Decision (1931 film) 
 The Night of January 16th (film) (1941)
 The Night of Love (1927)
 A Night of Mystery (1928)
 Night of the Garter (1933)
 The Night of the Iguana (film) (1964) 
 Night Parade (1929)
 Night Watch (1928 film) 
 Night Watch (1973 film) 
 The Night We Got the Bird (1961)
 The Night Without Pause (1931)
 The Nightbirds of London (1915)
 Nine (2009)
 Nine till Six (1932)
 Ninette (film) (2005)
 Niniche (1918 film)
 Niobe (film) (1915)
 No (2012 film) 
 No Exit (1962 film)
 No My Darling Daughter (1961)
 No One's Son (2008) 
 No Other Woman (1933 film) 
 No Place to Go (1939 film) 
 No Room at the Inn (1948)
 No Time for Comedy (1940)
 No Time for Sergeants (1958)
 Nobody's Money (1923)
 Nobody's Widow (1927)
 Noises Off... (1992)
 Non ti pago! (1942)
 Nonna Felicità (1938)
 Noose (1948 film)
 The Noose (film) (1928)
 Nora (1923 film) 
 Nora (1944 film) 
 Normal (2003 film) (TV)
 The Normal Heart (2014, TV)
 Norman... Is That You? (1976)
 North to Alaska (1960)
 Not Now, Comrade (1976)
 Not Now, Darling (film) (1973)
 Not Quite Paradise (1985)
 Not So Dumb (1930)
 Not Wanted on Voyage (1957)
 Nothing but the Truth (1929 film)
 Nothing but the Truth (1941 film)
 A Notorious Affair (1930)
 The Notorious Lady (1927)
 Now Barabbas (1949)
 The Nude Woman (1922)
 The Nude Woman (1926 film)
 The Nude Woman (1932 film)
 Number 17 (1928 film)
 Number 17 (1949 film)
 Number Seventeen (1932)
 Nurse Marjorie (1920)
 Nuts (1987 film) (1987)
 Nutty, Naughty Chateau (1963)

O 
 Odette (1916 film) 
 Odette (1928 film) 
 Odette (1934 film) 
 The Odd Couple (1968)
 Oedipus Mayor (1996)
 Oedipus Rex (1957 film) 
 Oedipus Rex (1967 film)
 Oedipus the King (1968 film) 
 Of Mice and Men (1939 film)
 Off the Map (film) (2003)
 The Offence (1973)
 Office Romance (1977)
 Oh, Boy! (1919 film)
 Oh Dad, Poor Dad, Mamma's Hung You in the Closet and I'm Feelin' So Sad (film) (1967)
 Oh, Daddy! (1935)
 Oh, Kay! (film) (1928)
 Oh, Lady, Lady (1920)
 Oh, Men! Oh, Women! (1957)
 Oh, Mr Porter! (1937)
 Oh Sailor Behave (1930, musical)
 Oh, What a Night (1935 film)
 O-Kay for Sound (1937)
 Oklahoma! (1955, musical)
 Old Acquaintance (1940)
 The Old Country (1921)
 Old English (film) (1930)
 Old Lady 31 (1920)
 The Old Maid (1939 film) 
 The Old Soak (1926)
 Oleanna (1994)
 Oliver! (1968, musical)
 On a Clear Day You Can See Forever (film) (1970, musical)
 On Approval (1930 film)
 On Approval (1944 film)
 On Borrowed Time (1939)
 On Golden Pond (1981)
 On Golden Pond (2001 film) (TV)
 On purge bébé (1931)
 On the Heights (1916)
 On the Quiet (1918)
 On the Riviera (1951, musical)
 On the Town (1949)
 On Your Toes (1939)
 On Trial (1928 film) 
 On Trial (1939 film) 
 On with the Show! (1929 film) 
 Once a Crook (1941)
 Once a Lady (1931)
 Once in a Lifetime (1932 film) 
 Once in the Life (2000)
 Once More, with Feeling! (1960)
 Once Upon A Mattress (2005, musical)
 Once Upon a Time (1933 film)
 One Does Not Play with Love (1926)
 One Flew Over the Cuckoo's Nest (film) (1975)
 One Hour with You (1932, musical)
 One More Tomorrow (film) (1946)
 One New York Night (1935)
 One Night Apart (1950)
 One Night in Istanbul (2014)
 One Night in Lisbon (1941)
 One Night in Transylvania (1941)
 One Night Stand (1978 film)
 One of the Best (film) (1927)
 One of Our Girls (1914)
 One Romantic Night (1930)
 One Special Night (1999, TV)
 One Sunday Afternoon (1933)
 One Sunday Afternoon (1948 film) 
 One Touch of Venus (film) (1948, musical)
 One, Two, Three (1961)
 One Wild Oat (1951)
 The Only Game in Town (film) (1970)
 The Only Son (1914 film)
 The Only Way (1927 film)
 Only When I Laugh (1981)
 Op Hoop van Zegen (1918 film)
 Op Hoop van Zegen (1924 film)
 Op Hoop van Zegen (1934 film)
 The Open Door (1957 film)
 The Opposite Sex (1956, musical)
 An Optimistic Tragedy (film) (1963)
 Orage (film) (1938)
 Orders Are Orders (1955)
 Orders Is Orders (1933)
 Ordet (1955)
 An Ordinary Miracle (1964 film)
 An Ordinary Miracle (1978 film)
 Orfeu (1999)
 The Orphan Muses (2000)
 Orphans (1987)
 Orphans of the Storm (1921)
 Orpheus Descending (film) (1990, TV)
 The Other (1930 film)
 Other People's Money (1991)
 The Other Side (1931 film)
 Oskar (film) (1962)
 Oscar (1967 film)
 Oscar (1991 film) 
 Our Betters (1933)
 Our Lady of the Turks (1968)
 Our Lord's Vineyard (1932)
 Our Mrs. McChesney (1918)
 Our Town (1940)
 Our Town (1955, TV)
 Our Town (2003)
 Our Wife (1941 film) (1941)
 Out of the Blue (1931 film)
 Out of the Fog (1941 film) (1941)
 Out to Win (1923 film)
 Outcast (1917 film)
 Outcast (1922 film)
 Outcast (1928 film) 
 The Outlaw and His Wife (1918)
 The Outrage (1964)
 Outward Bound (film) (1930)
 The Owl and the Pussycat (film) (1970)
 Over 21 (1945)
 Over She Goes (1937, musical)
 Over the Garden Wall (1934 film)

P 
 Paco and the Magical Book (2008)
 The Pad and How to Use It (1966)
 Paddy the Next Best Thing (1933 film) 
 O Pagador de Promessas (1962)
 The Pagan Lady (1931)
 Page Miss Glory (1935 film) 
 Paid (1930 film) 
 Paid in Full (1919 film) 
 Paint Your Wagon (1969, musical)
 Painting the Clouds with Sunshine (film) (1951, musical)
 A Pair of Briefs (1962)
 The Pajama Game (1957, musical)
 Pal Joey (1957, musical)
 The Palm Beach Girl (1926)
 Pals First (1926)
 Pamela (film) (1945)
 Panama Hattie (film) (1942)
 Pandora's Box (1929 film) 
 Papacito lindo (1939)
 Paprika (1932 film) 
 Paprika (1933 French film)
 Paprika (1959 film)
 Les Parents terribles (1948 film)
 Paris (1929 film)
 Paris Bound (1929)
 Paris Interlude (1934)
 Partners Again (1926)
 The Passing of the Third Floor Back (1918 film)
 The Passing of the Third Floor Back (1935)
 The Passion Flower (1921)
 The Passionate Plumber (1932)
 Pastor Hall (1940)
 Patate (film) (1964)
 Patrie (1917 film)
 Patrie (1946 film) 
 The Patriot (1928 film) 
 Patterns (film) (1956)
 The Patsy (1928 film)
 Payment Deferred (film) (1932)
 The Pay-Off (1930)
 Peacetime (film) (2009)
 Peaches in Syrup (1960)
 Peer Gynt (1915 film) 
 Peer Gynt (1919 film) 
 Peer Gynt (1934 film) 
 Peer Gynt (1941 film), starring Charlton Heston 
 Peg o' My Heart (1933 film) 
 Peg of Old Drury (1935)
 The Penthouse (1967 film) 
 Pepe (film) (1960)
 People Will Talk (1951)
 The Perfect Gentleman (film) (1935)
 The Perfect Marriage (1947)
 A Perfect Murder (1998)
 Perfect Pie (2002, see film adaptation)
 The Perfect Sap (1927)
 Perfect Strangers (1950 film) 
 Period of Adjustment (film) (1962)
 Personal Affair (1953)
 Peter Pan (1924 film) 
 Peter Pan (1953 film) 
 Peter Pan (1976 musical) (TV)
 Peter Pan (1988 film)
 Peter Pan (2003 film) (2003)
 Peter and Vandy (2009)
 The Peterville Diamond (1942)
 The Petrified Forest (1936)
 El Pez que Fuma (1977)
 Phaedra (film) (1962)
 The Phantom Lady (film) (1945)
 The Phantom Light (1935)
 The Phantom of the Opera (2004, musical)
 Phffft (1954)
 Philadelphia, Here I Come! (1977, see Film)
 The Philadelphia Story (1940)
 The Physician (1928 film)
 The Piano Lesson (film) (1995, TV)
 Picnic (1955 film) (1955)
 Pilot Premnath (1978)
 Pillars of Society (film) (1920)
 Le pillole di Ercole (1960)
 Pillow to Post (1945)
 The Pirate (1948 film) 
 The Pirate Movie (1982, musical)
 The Pirates of Penzance (1983, musical) 
 Pita (1991 film) (1991)
 A Place for Lovers (1968)
 A Place in the Sun (1951 film) (1951)
 Play It Again, Sam (1972)
 Playboy of Paris (1930, musical)
 The Playboy of the Western World (film) (1962)
 The Plaything (1929)
 Plaza Suite (1971)
 Please Stand By (2017)
 Please Turn Over (1959)
 The Pleasure of His Company (1961) 
 Plenty (film) (1985)
 The Plough and the Stars (film) (1937)
 Plunder (1931 film)
 Pokrovsky Gates (1982, TV)
 Poison Pen (1939 film)
 Poliche (1934)
 Polly of the Circus (1917 film) 
 Polly of the Circus (1932 film) 
 Polly With a Past (1920, silent)
 Poor as a Church Mouse (1931, musical)
 The Poor Little Rich Girl (1917)
 Poor Valbuena (1923)
 Poppy (1936 film) 
 Porgy and Bess (film) (1959)
 Port of Seven Seas (1938)
 The Porter from Maxim's (1927 film)
 The Porter from Maxim's (1933 film)
 The Porter from Maxim's (1939 film)
 The Porter from Maxim's (1953 film)
 The Porter from Maxim's (1976 film)
 Portrait in Black (1960)
 Possessed (1931 film) 
 La Possession (film) (1929)
 Possible Worlds (film) (2000)
 The Postponed Wedding Night (1953 film)
 Potash and Perlmutter (1923)
 Potiche (2010)
 The Potters (film) (1927)
 Poverty and Nobility (1954)
 Powder Room (film) (2013)
 Praetorius (film) (1965)
 Prelude to a Kiss (1992)
 President Haudecoeur (1940)
 President Panchatcharam (1959)
 La presidentessa (1977 film)
 The Priest from Kirchfeld (1914 film)
 The Priest from Kirchfeld (1937 film)
 The Priest from Kirchfeld (1955 film) 
 The Prime of Miss Jean Brodie (1969)
 The Primitive Lover (1922)
 Primrose Path (film) (1940)
 The Prince and the Beggarmaid (1921)
 The Prince and the Showgirl (1957)
 Prince Jean (1928)
 Prince Jean (1934 film)
 The Prince of Homburg (film) (1997)
 A Prince of Lovers (1922)
 The Prince of Pappenheim (1927)
 The Prince of Pappenheim (1952 film)
 The Prince of Rogues (1928, German silent film)
 A Prince There Was (1921)
 Princess Turandot (1934)
 Prison Without Bars (1938)
 The Prisoner of Second Avenue (1975)
 Private Fears in Public Places (film) (2006)
 The Private Life of Don Juan (1934)
 The Private Secretary (1931 German film)
 The Private Secretary (1931 Italian film)
 The Private Secretary (1935 film)
 Private Lives (film) (1931)
 Private Number (1936 film) 
 The Private Lives of Elizabeth and Essex (1939)
 Privates on Parade (film) (1982)
 The Producers (2005, musical)
 The Professional (2003 film)
 Profit and the Loss (1917)
 The Prom (film) (2020)
 The Promise (1969 film)
 Promise at Dawn (1970)
 Proof (2005)
 The Prosecutor Hallers (1930)
 The Prude's Fall (1925)
 Psycho Beach Party (2000)
 The Pure Truth (1931)
 Puritan Passions (1923)
 The Purple Highway (1923)
 The Purple Mask (1955)
 La Putain respectueuse (1952)
 Pygmalion (1938)
 Pygmalion (1983 film) (TV)

Q 
 Quality Street (1927 film) 
 Quality Street (1937 film) 
 Qualquer Gato Vira-Lata (2011)
 The Quare Fellow (1962, see Adaptation)
 Quartet (2012 film)
 ¡Que viene mi marido! (1940)
 The Queen of Biarritz (1934)
 The Queen of Moulin Rouge (1926)
 The Queen of Navarre (1942)
 The Queen Was in the Parlour (film) (1927)
 Queen's Evidence (film) (1919)
 Queer Cargo (1938)
 La quema de Judas (1974)
 Querô (2007)
 A Question of Adultery (1958)
 Quick (1932 film)
 Quiet Wedding (1941)
 Quills (2000)
 Quinneys (1919 film)
 Quinneys (1927 film)
 The Quispe Girls (2013)

R 
 Rabbit Hole (2010)
 The Racket (1928)
 The Racket (1951)
 Radiance (1988)
 Raffles, the Amateur Cracksman (1925)
 Rain (1932)
 Rain or Shine (1930)
 The Rainmaker (1956)
 A Raisin in the Sun (1961)
 A Raisin in the Sun (2008, TV)
 The Rakoczi March (1933)
 The Rat (1925)
 The Rat Race (1960)
 Ratha Kanneer (1954)
 Raktha Kanneeru (2003)
 Ratón de ferretería (1985)
 The Rats (1921)
 Rattlesnakes (2019)
 Die Ratten (1955)
 Ready Money (1914)
 Real Women Have Curves (2002)
 The Rebel (1931)
 Rebel (1985)
 The Rebellion of the Brides (1984)
 Rebound (1931)
 Reckless (1995)
 The Reckless Hour (1938)
 Red Dust (1932)
 Red Planet Mars (1952)
 The Red Robe (1933)
 Red Roses and Petrol (2008)
 Red Sky at Morning (1944)
 The Red Widow (1916)
 Redemption (1930)
 Redwood Curtain (1995, TV)
 Reefer Madness: The Movie Musical (2005, musical)
 Refuge (2012)
 Regeneration (1915)
 Registered Nurse (1934)
 Relative Values (2000)
 The Reluctant Debutante (1958)
 The Reluctant Hero (1941)
 Reluctant Heroes (1951)
 Remains to Be Seen (1953)
 The Remarkable Mr. Pennypacker (1959)
 The Removalists (1971)
 Rendezvous (1930)
 Rent (2005, musical)
 Repo! The Genetic Opera (2008)
 Requiem for a Heavyweight (1962)
 The Rescuing Angel (1919)
 The Respectful Prostitute (1946)
 Return of a Stranger (1937)
 The Return of Peter Grimm (1926)
 The Return of Peter Grimm (1935)
 Return of the Terror (1934)
 Return to Yesterday (1940)
 Reuben, Reuben (1983)
 Reunion in Vienna (1931)
 The Revenge (2002)
 Revengers Tragedy (2002)
 Rhinoceros (1974, TV)
 Rich and Famous (1981)
 Rich Man, Poor Man (1918)
 Richelieu (1914)
 The Richest Girl in the World (1958)
 The Riddle: Woman (1920)
 Riders to the Sea (1936)
 Riding High (1943)
 Das Riesenrad (1961)
 The Right Approach (1961)
 The Right to Love (1920)
 The Right to Strike (1923)
 Rigoletto (1918)
 The Ringer (1952)
 The Riot Club (2014)
 Rio Rita 
 Rip Van Winkle (1921)
 The Rise of Catherine the Great (1934)
 The Rising Generation (1928)
 Rita, Sue and Bob Too (1987)
 The Ritz (1976)
 The River Niger (1976)
 Road House (1934)
 Road of Hell (1931)
 The Road to Mecca (1991)
 Road to Paradise (1930)
 The Road to Singapore (1931)
 The Roadhouse Murder (1932)
 Roads of Destiny (1921)
 Roaring Years (1962)
 Robert and Bertram (1938)
 Rock of Ages (2012, musical)
 Rockabye (1932)
 The Rocky Horror Picture Show (1975, musical)
 The Rocky Horror Picture Show: Let's Do the Time Warp Again (2016, musical)
 Rogues of the Turf (1923)
 Romance (1920)
 Romance (1930)
 Romance in the Dark (1938)
 The Romance of Old Bill (1918)
 Romance of the Underworld (1928)
 Romance of the Western Chamber (1927)
 Romantic Comedy (1983)
 Romanoff and Juliet (1961)
 Romeo and Juliet (1968)
 Romeo + Juliet (1996)
 Romulus and the Sabines (1945)
 Romy and Michele's High School Reunion (1997)
 La Ronde (1950)
 Rookery Nook (1930)
 Room Service (1938)
 Rooted (1985, TV)
 Rope (1948)
 Rosalie (1937, musical)
 Rose Bernd (1919)
 Rose Bernd (1957)
 Rose-Marie (1928)
 Rose Marie (1936)
 Rose of the Rancho (1914)
 Rose of the Rancho (1936)
 The Rose Tattoo (1955)
 Rosencrantz & Guildenstern Are Dead (1990)
 Rosenmontag (1924)
 Rosie! (1967)
 Rosita (1923)
 The Rossiter Case (1951)
 The Rotters (1921)
 La Route impériale (1935)
 Roxanne (1987)
 Roxie Hart (1942) 
 The Royal Bed (1931)
 The Royal Family of Broadway (1930)
 The Royal Hunt of the Sun (1969)
 A Royal Scandal (1945)
 Róża (1936)
 The Ruling Class (1972)
 Run for Your Wife (2912)
 The Runaway Bride (1930)
 The Runner Stumbles (1979)
 Rusty Bugles (1966, 1981)
 Ruy Blas (1948)

S 
 Sabrina (1954 film) 
 Sabrina (1995 film) 
 The Sacrament (1989 film)
 Sacred and Profane Love (film) (1921)
 The Sacred Flame (1929 film) 
 The Sacred Flame (1931 film) 
 Sacred Woods (1939)
 Sacrifice (2010)
 Sad Loves (1943)
 Sadie Love (1919)
 Sadie Thompson (1928)
 Safe in Hell (1931)
 Sailor Beware! (1956 film)
 The Sailor Takes a Wife (1945)
 Saint Joan (1957)
 Saint Joan (1967 film) (TV)
 Saint John, the Beheaded (1940)
 Saints and Sinners (1916 film)
 Sally (1925 film)
 Sally (1929 film)
 Sally in Our Alley (1931 film)
 Sally, Irene and Mary (1925)
 Sally of the Sawdust (1925)
 Salomé (1923 film) 
 Salome's Last Dance (1988)
 Salomé (2013 film) 
 Saloon Bar (1940)
 Salvation Nell (1931 film) 
 Same Time, Next Year (1978)
 Samson (1915 film) 
 Samson (1923 film)
 Samson (1936 film)
 Sangen til livet (1943)
 The Saphead (1920)
 The Sapphires (film) (2012)
 Sara (1992 film) 
 Sarafina! (film) (1992)
 Santa Claus Is a Stinker (1979)
 The Saturday Night Kid (1929)
 Saturday's Children (1929 film)
 Saturday's Children (1940)
 Save a Little Sunshine (1938)
 Saved from the Sea (1920)
 Say It in French (1938)
 Sayonara (2015 film)
 The Scamp (1957)
 The Scandal (1923 film)
 The Scandal (1934 French film)
 Scared Stiff (1953 film) 
 Scarlet Pages (1930)
 Scarlet Street (1945)
 Scènes de ménage (1954)
 Der Schinderhannes (1958)
 School for Coquettes (1935 film)
 School for Coquettes (1958 film)
 School for Husbands (1937)
 The School for Scandal (1923 film) 
 The School for Scandal (1930 film) 
 Scorchers (1991)
 Score (1974 film) (1974)
 The Scotland Yard Mystery (1934)
 Scrambled Wives (1921)
 Scum (film) (1979)
 Sea Fog (2014)
 The Sea Gull (1968)
 The Seagull (1972 film)
 The Seagull (2018 film) 
 Seagulls Over Sorrento (1954)
 Search and Destroy (1995 film) 
 The Search for Signs of Intelligent Life in the Universe (1991)
 The Searching Wind (1946)
 The Second Greatest Sex (1955, musical)
 The Second Mrs Tanqueray (1916 film)
 The Second Wife (1922 film)
 Second Wife (1930 film) 
 Second Youth (1938 film)
 Secret Agent (1936 film)
 The Secret Bride (1934)
 The Secret Hour (film) (1928)
 The Secret of Polichinelle (1923 film)
 The Secret of Polichinelle (1936 film)
 The Secret Rapture (film) (1993)
 Secrets (1924 film)
 Secrets (1933 film) 
 Secrets of the Night (1924)
 Il seduttore (1954)
 Send Me No Flowers (1964)
 De Sensatie van de Toekomst (1931)
 Sensation (film) (1936)
 Sentimental Yasuko (2012)
 Separate Tables (1958)
 Seven Chances (1925)
 Seven Keys to Baldpate (1916 film)
 Seven Keys to Baldpate (1929 film) 
 Seven Keys to Baldpate (1935 film) 
 Seven Keys to Baldpate (1947 film)
 Seven Sinners (1936 film) 
 The Seven Sisters (film) (1915)
 Seven Sweethearts (1942)
 The Seven Year Itch (1955)
 Seventeen (1940 film)
 Seventh Heaven (1937)
 The Seventh Seal (1957)
 A Severa (film) (1931)
 Sextette (1978)
 Sexual Life (2005)
 Sh! The Octopus (1937)
 The Shadow (1933 film)

 The Shadow Box (1980, TV)
 Shadow of Angels (1976)
 Shadow of the Law (1930)
 Shadowlands (1995)
 Shadows (1953 film)
 Shadows of a Great City (1913)
 Shadows of Paris (1924)
 Shadows on the Stairs (1941)
 Sham (film) (1921)
 The Shanghai Gesture (1941)
 Shanghai Lady (1929)
 The Shape of Things (2003)
 She Couldn't Help It (1920)
 She Has a Name (film) (2016)
 She Loves Me Not (1934 film) 
 She Wolves (1925)
 Shed Skin Papa (2016)
 She's My Weakness (1930)
 She's Working Her Way Through College (1952)
 Sherlock Holmes (1922 film) 
 Sherlock Holmes (1932 film) 
 The Shining Hour (1938)
 Shining Victory (1941)
 Shirley Valentine (1989)
 Shoot Loud, Louder... I Don't Understand (1966)
 Shoot the Works (film) (1934, musical)
 The Shop Around the Corner (1940)
 Shore Acres (film) (1920)
 Shore Leave (film) (1925)
 Shining Victory (1925)
 Short Eyes (film) (1977)
 A Shot in the Dark (1964)
 Should Ladies Behave (1933)
 The Show-Off (1926 film) 
 The Show-Off (1934 film) 
 The Show-Off (1946 film) 
 Show Boat (1936, musical)
 Show Boat (1951, musical)
 Show Flat (1936)
 The Shrike (film) (1955)
 The Shulamite (film) (1915)
 Shut Yer Dirty Little Mouth! (2001)
 Sick Abed (1920)
 The Side Show of Life (1924)
 Side Street Story (1950)
 The Sign of the Cross (1914 film) 
 The Sign of the Cross (1932 film) 
 The Sign on the Door (1921)
 Sikke'n familie (1963)
 Silence (1931 film)
 Silent Dust (1949)
 The Silent House (1929 film)
 Silent Night, Lonely Night (1969, TV)
 The Silent Voice (film) (1915)
 Silk Stockings (1957 film) 
 The Silver Cord (film) (1933)
 The Silver King (1929 film)
 Simpatico (film) (1999)
 Simon and Laura (1955)
 Simone (1918 film) 
 Simone (1926 film)
 The Sin of Julia (1946)
 The Sin of Madelon Claudet (1931)
 Sincerely Yours (film) (1955, musical)
 Sing Sinner Sing (1933)
 A Single Man (1929 film)
 A Single Woman (film) (2008)
 Sinners (1920 film) 
 Sinners' Holiday (1930)
 Sister Cities (film) (2016)
 A Sister of Six (1926 film) 
 The Sisters (2005 film) (2005)
 Six Dance Lessons in Six Weeks (film) (2014)
 Six Days a Week (1965)
 Six Degrees of Separation (1993)
 Six Cylinder Love (1931 film) 
 Skeleton on Horseback (1937)
 The Skin Game (1921 film) 
 The Skin Game (1931 film) 
 Skylark (1941 film) 
 A Slave of Vanity (1920)
 Sleeping Beauty (1942 film)
 Sleuth (1972)
 Sleuth (2007)
 A Slight Case of Murder (1938)
 Small Hotel (1957)
 Smart Woman (1931 film) 
 Smarty (film) (1934)
 Smilin' Through (1922 film) 
 Smilin' Through (1932 film) 
 Smilin' Through (1941 film) 
 The Smiling Lieutenant (1931)
 Smiling Maniacs (1975)
 Smith (1917 film) 
 Smoking/No Smoking (1993)
 Smooth as Satin (1925)
 The Snow Maiden (1952 film) 
 Snowstorm (film) (1977)
 Snow White (1916 film) 
 So Long Letty (1920 film) 
 So Long Letty (1929 film)
 So This Is London (1930 film) 
 So This Is London (1939 film)
 So This Is Paris (1926 film) 
 A Society Exile (1919)
 A Society Scandal (1924)
 Sold (1915 film) 
 A Soldier's Story (1984)
 The Solid Gold Cadillac (1956)
 The Solitaire Man (1933)
 Some Like It Hot (1939 film)
 Some Voices (film) (2000)
 Somehow Good (1927)
 Someone at the Door (1936 film)
 Someone at the Door (1950 film)
 Something for the Boys (film) (1944, musical)
 A Son from America (1924 film)
 A Son from America (1932 film)
 The Son-Daughter (1932)
 The Song and Dance Man (1926)
 Song and Dance Man (film) (1936)
 The Song of Songs (1933 film) 
 Song of the Flame (1930, musical)
 Song of the West (1930, musical)
 Sons o' Guns (1936)
 The Sons of the Marquis Lucera (1939)
 Sordid Lives (2000)
 Sorority House (film) (1939)
 S.O.S. (1928 film)
 S.O.S. Sahara (1938)
 The Sound of Music (1965, musical) 
 The Sound of Music Live (2015) (TV, musical)
 South Pacific (1958, musical)
 South Pacific (2001 film) (TV)
 South Sea Rose (1929)
 South Sea Woman (1953)
 Southern Baptist Sissies (2013)
 Sowing the Wind (1916 film)
 Sowing the Wind (1921 film) 
 The Spanish Dancer (1923)
 The Spanish Fly (1931 film)
 The Spanish Fly (1955 film)
 Speakeasy (1929 film)
 Special Treatment (1980)
 Speech & Debate (2017)
 The Spendthrift (1917 film) 
 The Spendthrift (1953 film) 
 The Spendthrift (1964 film)
 The Spider's Web (1960 film)
 Spies of the Air (1939)
 Splendor (1935 film)
 Splinters (2018 film)
 De Spooktrein (1939)
 The Sport of Kings (1931 film)
 Sporting Life (1918 film)
 Sporting Life (1925 film)
 Sporting Love (film) (1936, musical)
 The Sporting Lover (1926)
 A Spot of Bother (1938)
 Spring and Port Wine (1970)
 Spring Awakening (1924 film) 
 Spring Fever (1927 film) 
 Spring Handicap (1937)
 Spring Is Here (film) (1930)
 Spring Madness (1938)
 Spring Meeting (1941)
 Spring Tonic (1935)
 Springtime for Henry (1934)
 The Squall (1929)
 Square Crooks (1928)
 The Square Ring (1953)
 The Squatter's Daughter (1910 film)
 The Squaw Man (1914 film) 
 The Squaw Man (1918 film) 
 The Squaw Man (1931 film) 
 The Squeaker (1937 film)
 Stage Beauty (2004)
 Stage Door (1937)
 A Stage Romance (1922)
 Stage Struck (1958 film)
 Staircase (film) (1969)
 Stalag 17 (1953)
 Stamboul (film) (1932)
 Star Spangled Girl (1971)
 State of the Union (film) (1948)
 Station Six-Sahara (1962)
 The Statue (1971 film) 
 Station Master (1941 film)
 Steaming (film) (1985)
 Steel Magnolias (1987)
 Steel Magnolias (2012 film) (TV)
 Step Lively (1944 film) 
 Stepping Out (1931 film) (1931)
 Stevie (1978 film)
 Stop, You're Killing Me (1952)
 Storm in a Teacup (film) (1937)
 Stork (film) (1971)
 Story of a Bad Woman (1948)
 The Story of Shirley Yorke (1948)
 Straight Is the Way (1934)
 Straight-Jacket (2004)
 The Straight Road (1914)
 The Strange Affair of Uncle Harry (1945)
 Strange Experiment (1937)
 Strange Interlude (film) (1932)
 The Strange Love of Molly Louvain (1932)
 The Strange Marchioness (1940)
 The Strange One (1957)
 Strangers of the Night (1923)
 Strangling Threads (1923)
 The Straw Hat (1974)
 The Straw Lover (1951)
 The Strawberry Blonde (1941)
 Streamers (1983)
 Street Scene (film) (1931)
 A Streetcar Named Desire (1951)
 A Streetcar Named Desire (1984 film) (TV)
 A Streetcar Named Desire (1995 film) (TV
 The Streets of London (1929 film) 
 The Streets of London (1934 film) 
 Strictly Ballroom (1993)
 Strictly Dishonorable (1931)
 Strictly Dishonorable (1951)
 Strictly Modern (1930)
 Strictly Unconventional (1930)
 The Stripper (film) (1963)
 The Stronger Sex (1931)
 Strongheart (film) (1914)
 The Stubbornness of Geraldine (1915)
 The Student (2016 film) (2016)
 The Student and Mister Henri (2015)
 The Student Prince (film) (1954)
 The Student Prince in Old Heidelberg (1927)
 The Subject Was Roses (film) (1968)
 The Substance of Fire (1996)
 SubUrbia (1996)
 Success at Any Price (1934)
 A Successful Calamity (1932)
 Such a Little Queen (1914 film) 
 Suddenly, Last Summer (1959)
 The Sum of Us (film) (1994)
 Summer and Smoke (film) (1961)
 Summer Holiday (1948 film) 
 Summer in Tyrol (1964)
 Summer of the Seventeenth Doll (1959 film)
 Summertime (1955 film) 
 Summertree (1971)
 Sunday in New York (1963)
 Sunday on the Rocks 2004)
 Sunny (1941 film) 
 The Sunny South or The Whirlwind of Fate (1915)
 Sunrise at Campobello (1960)
 The Sunset Limited (film) (2011, TV)
 The Sunshine Boys (1975)
 The Sunshine Boys (1996 film) (TV)
 Sunshine Susie (1931)
 The Supper (1992)
 Susan and God (1940)
 Susan Slept Here (1954)
 The Swan (1925 film) (1925)
 The Swan (film) (1956)
 Sweeney Todd (1928 film)
 Sweeney Todd: The Demon Barber of Fleet Street (2007, musical)
 Sweet and Twenty (1919)
 Sweet Bird of Youth (1962 film) 
 Sweet Bird of Youth (1989 film) (TV)
 Sweet Charity (1969, musical)
 Sweet Kitty Bellairs (1916 film) 
 Sweet Kitty Bellairs (1930, musical)
 Sweet Lavender (1915 film) 
 Sweet Nothing in My Ear (2008, TV)
 Sweet November (1968 film) 
 Sweet Revenge (1998 film)
 The Sweet Sad Story of Elmo and Me (1965, TV)
 Sweethearts and Wives (1930)
 Swell Guy (1946)
 Swimming to Cambodia (1987)
 Swing High, Swing Low (film) (1937)
 Swing Your Lady (1938, musical)
 Switching Channels (1988)

T 
 The Table of the Poor  (1932)
 Take a Chance (1937 film)
 Take a Giant Step (1959)
 Take Care of Amelia (1925)
 Take Care of Amelie (1932)
 Take Her, She's Mine (1963)
 Take My Tip (1937)
 Taking Sides (film) (2001)
 Tales from the Vienna Woods (1979 film) 
 Talk Radio (film) (1988)
 Tall Story (1960)
 The Taming of the Shrew (1929 film) 
 The Taming of the Shrew (1967 film) 
 Tante Jutta aus Kalkutta (1953)
 Tape (2001)
 Tarnish (film) (1924)
 Tartuffe (1926 film)
 Tartuffe (1965 film) (TV)
 Le tartuffe (1984)
 A Taste of Honey (film) (1961)
 Taxi! (1932)
 Tea for Two (film) (1950)
 Tea and Sympathy (film) (1956)
 The Teahouse of the August Moon (film) (1956)
 Tectonic Plates (film) (1992)
 Teenage Rebel (1956)
 The Telephone Girl (1927 film) 
 Television (1931 film)
 A Temperamental Wife (1919)
 A Temporary Gentleman (1920)
 The Temporary Widow (1930)
 Temptation (1929 film)
 Temptation: Confessions of a Marriage Counselor (2013)
 Ten Minute Alibi (1935)
 Tender Son: The Frankenstein Project (2010)
 The Tender Trap (film) (1955)
 The Tenth Man (1936 film) 
 The Terrible Lovers (1936)
 The Terror (1928 film) 
 The Terror (1938 film) 
 Terrors of Pleasure (1988)
 Tesoro mio (1979)
 Des Teufels General (1955)
 A Texas Steer (1927)
 Thank You (1925 film)
 Thanks for the Memory (film) (1938)
 Thark (film) (1932)
 That Certain Feeling (film) (1956)
 That Championship Season (1982 film) 
 That Dangerous Age (1949)
 That Forward Center Died at Dawn (1961)
 That Good Night (film) (2017)
 That Night in Rio (1941, musical)
 That Uncertain Feeling (film) (1941)
 That's a Good Girl (1933)
 That's My Uncle (1935)
 Their Big Moment (1934)
 Theodora (1921 film)
 There Goes the Bride (1980 film)
 There Shall Be No Night (1957, see TV adaptation)
 There Was a Crooked Man (film) (1960)
 There You Are! (1926)
 These Girls (2005)
 These Three (1936)
 They Came by Night (1940)
 They Came to a City (1944)
 They Don't Wear Black Tie (1981)
 They Just Had to Get Married (1932)
 They Knew What They Wanted (film) (1940)
 They Might Be Giants (1971)
 The Time of Your Life (film) (1948)
 Thieves (1977 film) 
 Things Happen at Night (1947)
 The Third Degree (1919 film)
 The Third Degree (1926 film)
 Third Time Lucky (1931 film)
 Thirteen at the Table (1955)
 The Thirteenth Chair (1919 film)
 The Thirteenth Chair (1929 film)
 The Thirteenth Chair (1937 film)
 Thirty Days (1922 film) 
 This Happy Breed (film) (1944)
 This Happy Feeling (1958)
 This Is the Life (1944 film) 
 This Is the Night (1932 film) (1932)
 This Love of Ours (1945)
 This Man Is Mine (1946 film)
 This Property is Condemned (1966)
 This Reckless Age (1932)
 This Thing Called Love (1929 film) 
 This Thing Called Love (1940 film)
 This Was a Woman (1948)
 Those Endearing Young Charms (film) (1945)
 Those We Love (1932)
 A Thousand Clowns (1965)
 Three Blind Mice (1938 film) 
 Three Boys, One Girl (1948)
 Three Faces East (1926 film)
 Three Faces East (1930 film) 
 Three for the Show (1955)
 Three Is a Family (1944)
 Three Little Girls in Blue (1946)
 Three Live Ghosts (1922 film)
 The Three Masks (1929)
 Three Men and a Girl (1919)
 Three Men on a Horse (film) (1936)
 The Three of Us (1914 film)
 Three on a Spree (1961)
 Three Sailors and a Girl (1953)
 The Three Sisters (1966 film) 
 The Three Sisters (1970 film) (TV)
 Three Sisters (1970 Olivier film) 
 Three Sisters (1994 film)
 Three Wise Fools (1923 film)
 Three Wise Fools (1946 film) 
 Three-Cornered Moon (1933)
 The Threepenny Opera (1931 film) 
 Thunder in the Night (1935)
 Thunder on the Hill (1951)
 Thunder Rock (1942)
 The Thunderstorm (1957)
 The Tiger Makes Out (1967)
 Tiger Rose (1923 film) 
 Tiger Rose (1929 film)
 Tight Spot (1955)
 Til sæters (1924)
 Tillie's Punctured Romance (1914 film) 
 Tilly of Bloomsbury (1921 film)
 Tilly of Bloomsbury (1931 film)
 Tilly of Bloomsbury (1940 film)
 Time Limit (film) (1957)
 The Time of Your Life (film) (1948)
 Time Out for Rhythm (1941, musical)
 Time Without Pity (1957)
 Times Square Playboy (1936)
 Tip Toes (1927)
 'Tis Pity She's a Whore (film) (1971)
 To Dorothy a Son (1954)
 To Gillian on Her 37th Birthday (1996)
 To Have and to Hold (1951 film)
 To Kill a Dragon (1989)
 To Oblige a Lady (1931)
 To the Ladies (1923)
 A Toast to Melba (see 1980 TV production)
 Tobacco Road (film) (1941)
 Toby's Bow (1919)
 To-Day (1917)
 Tom & Viv (1994)
 Tom at the Farm (2013)
 Tomorrow (1972)
 Tomorrow and Tomorrow (1932)
 Tomorrow, the World! (1944)
 Tommy (1931)
 Tommy Atkins (1915)
 Tommy Atkins (1928)
 The Tongues of Men (1916)
 Toni (1928)
 Tonight Is Ours (1933)
 Tonight and Every Night (1945, musical)
 Tonight or Never (1931)
 Tons of Money (1924)
 Tons of Money (1930)
 Tony Draws a Horse (1950)
 Too Many Girls (1940)
 Too Many Husbands (1940)
 Too Much Johnson (1919)
 Too Much Johnson (1938)
 Too Young for Love (1953)
 Too Young to Marry (1931)
 Topaze (1933 American film) 
 Topaze (1933 French film)
 Topaze (1951 film)
 Torch Song Trilogy (film) (1988)
 Tosca (1941 film) 
 Tosca (1956 film) 
 La Tosca (1973 film)
 Tovarich (film) (1937)
 Tovaritch (film) (1935)
 Toys in the Attic (1963 film) 
 The Tragedy of Man (film) (2011)
 The Trail of the Lonesome Pine (1916 film) 
 The Trail of the Lonesome Pine (1923 film) 
 The Train for Venice (1936)
 Traveling Light (1944 film)
 The Traveling Salesman (1916)
 The Traveling Salesman (1921)
 Traveller's Joy (1949)
 Travelling North (1987)
 Treasure Hunt (1952 film)
 Trelawny of the Wells (film) (1916)
 The Trial of Madame X (1948) 
 The Trial of Mary Dugan (1929 film) 
 The Trial of Mary Dugan (1931 film) 
 The Trial of Mary Dugan (1941 film)
 Tribute (1980 film)
 The Trip to Bountiful (1985)
 A Trip to Chinatown (film) (1926)
 A Trip to Paradise (1921, silent)
 The Triumph of Love (2001 film) 
 The Trojan Women (film) (1971)
 Trouble in Paradise (1932 film) 
 Trouble with Jolanthe (1934)
 Troublesome Wives (1928)
 True Confession (1937)
 The True Jacob (1931 film) 
 Trunk Crime (1939)
 The Truth About Youth (1930)
 Tuesday's Guest (1950)
 The Tunnel of Love (1958)
 The Turkey (film) (1931)
 Turkey Time (1933 film)
 Turn to the Right (1922)
 The Turning (1992 film) 
 Twelve Angry Men (Westinghouse Studio One) (1954)
 Twelve Miles Out (1927)
 The Twelve Pound Look (1920)
 Twentieth Century (1934)
 Twigs (play) (1975, TV)
 Twin Beds (1942 film) 
 Two Against the World (1932 film) 
 Two Against the World (1936 film) 
 Two for the Seesaw (1962)
 Two for Tonight (1935, musical)
 Two Friends (2002 film)
 Two Friends (2015 film)
 Two Hearts Beat as One (film) (1932)
 Two Idiots in Hollywood (1988)
 Two Kinds of Women (1932 film) 
 Two Little Drummer Boys (1928)
 Two Lost in a Dirty Night (2002)
 Two Minutes Silence (1933)
 The Two Mrs. Carrolls (1947)
 The Two Orphans (1915 film) 
 The Two Orphans (1933 film)
 The Two Orphans (1942 film)
 The Two Orphans (1944 film)
 The Two Orphans (1949 film)
 The Two Orphans (1950 film)
 The Two Orphans (1976 film)
 Two Small Bodies (1993)
 Two Timid Souls (1928)
 Two Timid Souls (1943 film)
 The Two Sergeants (1913 film)
 The Two Sergeants (1922 film)
 The Two Sergeants (1951 film)
 Two Women (2014 film)
 Two-Fisted (1935)
 Turandot, Princess of China (1935)
 The Typist (1931)
 Tyrannens fald (1942)
 The Tyrant of Padua (1946)

U 
 Una (film) (2016)
 The Unchastened Woman (1925)
 Uncle Tom's Cabin (1914 film) 
 Uncle Vanya (1957 film) 
 Uncle Vanya (1963 film)
 Uncle Vanya (1970 film) 
 Uncommon Women and Others (1978, TV)
 Under Capricorn (1949)
 Under False Flag (1935 film) 
 Under Milk Wood (1972 film)
 Under Milk Wood (2015 film)
 Under the Gaslight (film) (1914)
 Under the Lash (1921)
 Under the Yum Yum Tree (1963)
 Under Two Flags (1916 film)
 Under Your Hat (1940, musical)
 Uneasy Virtue (1931)
 Unexpected Conflict (1948)
 The Unfaithful (1947 film) 
 The Unforgettable Year 1919 (film)
 The Unguarded Hour (1936)
 Unjustified Absence (1939)
 Union Depot (film) (1932)
 The Unknown Purple (1923)
 Unnatural & Accidental (2006)
 Unripe Fruit (1934)
 The Unsinkable Molly Brown (1964, musical)
 The Unusual Past of Thea Carter (1929)
 Up in Central Park (film) (1948, musical)
 Up in Mabel's Room (1944 film) 
 Up Pops the Devil (1931)
 Urbania (2000)
 Urge to Kill (film) (1960)
 Used People (1992)

V 
 Va savoir (2001)
 The Vagabond King (1930 film) 
 The Valiant (1929)
 The Valiant Navigator (1935)
 The van Paemel Family (1986)
 Vanya on 42nd Street (1994)
 Vanity (1935 film) 
 Vanity (1947 film)
 Vassa (film) (1983), 
 Vassa Zheleznova (film) (1953)
 Vengeful Heart (2014)
 Venus in Fur (film) (2013)
 Le Vertige (1926)
 The Very Idea (1929)
 A Very Young Lady (1941)
 Vestire gli ignudi (1953)
 The Vicious Circle (1948 film)
 Victor (1951 film) 
 A View from the Bridge (film) (1962)
 The Village Squire (1935)
 Vintage Wine (1935)
 The Violin Maker of Mittenwald (1950)
 The Virginian (1914 film) 
 The Virginian (1946 film) 
 Virginia's Husband (1928 film)
 Virginia's Husband (1934 film)
 The Virtuous Model (1919)
 The Virtuous Sin (1930)
 A Virtuous Vamp (1919)
 The Visit (1964)
 Visit to a Small Planet (1960)
 Vita and Virginia (2018)
 Vogue la galère (1973)
 Voice of the City (1929)
 The Voice of the Turtle (film) (1947)
 Volcano! (1926 film) (1926)
 The Vortex (film) (1928)
 Il voto (1950)
 Vrijdag (1980)

W 
 The Wait (2015 film)
 Wait Until Dark (1967)
 The Walk (1953 film)
 Wallflower (film) (1948)
 Waltz of the Toreadors (film) (1962)
 The Wanderer (1925 film) 
 The Wandering Jew (1923 film)
 The Waning Sex (1926)
 The War Boys (2009)
 War Brides (1916 film) (1916)
 The War Lord (1965)
 The Ware Case (1938 film)
 A Warm Corner (1930)
 Warn That Man (1943)
 The Warren Case (1934)
 Watch Beverly (1932)
 Watch on the Rhine (1943)
 Watch Your Stern (1960)
 Water Drops on Burning Rocks (2000)
 The Water Engine (film) (1992, TV)
 Water for Canitoga (1939)
 Waterfront (1939 film) 
 Waterloo Bridge (1931)
 Waterloo Bridge (1940)
 Way Down East (1920)
 Way Down East (1935 film) 
 The Way to the Stars (1945)
 The Waybacks (film) (1918)
 We Moderns (1925)
 We Thieves Are Honourable (1942 film)
 We Thieves Are Honourable (1956 film)
 We Were Dancing (film) (1942)
 A Weak Woman (1933)
 The Weaker Sex (1933 film)
 The Weaker Sex (1948)
 The Weavers (1927 film) 
 The Wedding (1972 film)
 Wedding in White (1972)
 The Wedding March (1915 film)
 The Wedding March (1929 film)
 The Wedding March (1934 film)
 The Wedding of Valeni (1914)
 Week-End at the Waldorf (1945)
 Wehe, wenn er losgelassen (1932)
 Der Weibsteufel (1966 film)
 Welcome Home (1925 film) 
 Welcome Stranger (1924 film)
 We're No Angels (1955 film) 
 We're Not Dressing (1934)
 We're on the Jury (1937)
 We're Rich Again (1934)
 West of Shanghai (1937)
 West of Zanzibar (1928 film) 
 The Wedding (1972 film) (1972)
 West Side Story (1961, musical)
 The Whales of August (1987)
 What a Girl Wants (film) (2003)
 What a Life (film) (1939)
 What a Girl Wants (film) (2003)
 What a Man (1930 film) (1930)
 What Every Woman Knows (1917 film)
 What Every Woman Knows (1921 film) 
 What Every Woman Knows (1934 film) 
 What Happened to Jones (1926 film) 
 What Money Can Buy (1928)
 What Price Decency (1933)
 What Price Glory? (1926 film) 
 What Price Glory (1952 film) 
 What's in a Name? (2012 film)
 The Wheel (1925 film)
 The Wheel of Life (1929 film) 
 When I Came Back (1926)
 When Knighthood Was in Flower (1922 film) 
 When Knights Were Bold (1916 British film)
 When Knights Were Bold (1929 film)
 When Ladies Meet (1933 film) 
 When Ladies Meet (1941 film) 
 When Love Is Over (1931)
 When My Baby Smiles at Me (film) (1948)
 When the Boys Meet the Girls (1965, musical)
 When the Dead Start Singing (1998)
 When We Are Married (1943)
 When You Comin' Back, Red Ryder? (film) (1979)
 When's Your Birthday? (1937)
 Where Sinners Meet (1934)
 Where's Charley? (film) (1952)
 Where There's a Will (1955 film)
 While Parents Sleep (1935)
 Whistling in the Dark (1933 film) 
 Whistling in the Dark (1941 film) 
 White Cargo (1930 film)
 White Cargo (1942)
 The White Eagle (1928)
 The White Heather (1919)
 The White Horse Inn (1926 film) 
 White Horse Inn (1948 film)
 The White Horse Inn (1952 film) 
 The White Lilac (1935)
 White Nights (1916 film)
 The White Sister (1915 film) 
 White Woman (1933)
 Who Goes There! (1952)
 Who Is the Man? (1924)
 Who Killed the Cat? (1966)
 Who Was That Lady? (1960)
 Who's Afraid of Virginia Woolf? (1966)
 Who's Your Lady Friend? (1937)
 The Whole Town's Talking (1926 film)
 Whoopee! (film) (1930, musical)
 Whose Life Is It Anyway? (film) (1981)
 Why Did I Get Married? (2007)
 Why Men Leave Home (1924)
 Why Smith Left Home (1919)
 Why Women Love (1925)
 Wide Blue Yonder (film) (2010)
 The Widow (1939 film)
 The Widow from Monte Carlo (1935)
 Widow's Might (1935)
 The Wife (1995 film) 
 The Wild Duck (film) (1984)
 Wife for a Night (1952)
 Wild Girl (film) (1932)
 Wildfire (1915 film) 
 The Will (1921 film)
 Will Not End Here (2008)
 Will Success Spoil Rock Hunter? (1957)
 William Ratcliff (film) (1922)
 William Tell (1934 film) 
 William Tell (1949 film) 
 The Willow Tree (1920 film) 
 Windfall (1935 film)
 Wine of Youth (1924)
 Winged Victory (film) (1944)
 The Winner (1996 film)
 The Winning Goal (1920)
 The Winslow Boy (1948)
 The Winslow Boy (1999)
 Winterset (film) (1936)
 The Wiser Sex (1932)
 The Wishing Ring: An Idyll of Old England (1914)
 Wit (film) (2001, TV)
 The Witching Hour (1934 film) 
 Within the Law (1916 film)
 Within the Law (1923 film)
 Within the Law (1939 film) 
 Without a Dowry (film) (1937)
 Without Love (1945)
 Without Regret (film) (1935)
 Without You I'm Nothing (1990)
 The Witness for the Defense (1919)
 Witness for the Prosecution (1957 film)
 Witness for the Prosecution (1982 film) (TV)
 Wives and Lovers (film) (1963)
 Wives Under Suspicion (1938)
 The Wiz (1978, musical)
 Wolves and Sheep (film) (1953)
 The Woman and the Puppet (1920 film)
 The Woman and the Puppet (1929 film) 
 The Woman Between (1931 British film)
 Woman Doctors (1984)
 The Woman from Monte Carlo (1932)
 The Woman from Moscow (1928)
 Woman Hungry (1931)
 A Woman in Pawn (1927)
 The Woman in Room 13 (1920)
 The Woman in Room 13 (1932 film)
 The Woman in the Case (1916 American film) 
 The Woman in the Cupboard (1927)
 The Woman of Bronze (1923)
 A Woman of Experience (1931)
 A Woman of No Importance (1921 film)
 A Woman of No Importance (1937 film)
 A Woman of No Importance (1945 film)
 The Woman on the Index (1919)
 The Woman on the Jury (1924)
 The Woman on Trial (1927)
 Woman to Woman (1923 film)
 Woman to Woman (1947 film)
 Woman Trap (1929 film)
 The Woman With Four Faces (1923)
 A Woman's Face (1938 film)
 A Woman's Face (1941)
 The Women (1939)
 The Women (2008 film)
 Women Aren't Angels (1943)
 Women Love Once (1931)
 Women's Sacrifice (1922)
 The Women's War (film) (1928)
 Women Who Play (1932)
 The Wonderful Day (1929 film)
 The Wonderful Day (1932 film)
 The Wonderful Day (1980 film)
 The Wonderful Ice Cream Suit (1998)
 The Woodsman (2004)
 The Word (1943 film)
 Words Upon the Window Pane (1994)
 The World and the Woman (1916)
 The World at Her Feet (1927)
 The World of Suzie Wong (film) (1960)
 The World's Champion (1922)
  The World, the Flesh, the Devil (1932)
 Worm's Eye View (1951)
 Woyzeck (1979 film) 
 Woyzeck (1994 film) 
 Wozzeck (film) (1947)
 The Wrecker (1929 film)
 WTC View (2005)
yes

Y 
 The Yankee Girl (1915)
 The Years Between (film) (1946)
 Yellow Jack (1938)
 The Yellow Mask (1930)
 The Yellow Passport (1916)
 The Yellow Ticket (1918 film) 
 Yentl (film) (1983)
 Yerma (1984 film) (1984)
 Yerma (1998 film) (1998)
 Yegor Bulychov and Others (1953)
 Yes, Mr Brown (1933)
 Yes, My Darling Daughter (film) (1939)
 Yes or No? (1920)
 Yo quiero ser tonta (1950)
 You Ain't Seen Nothin' Yet (film)
 You Are Me (1936, musical)
 You Can't Fool Antoinette (1936)
 You Can't Get Away with Murder (1939)
 You Can't Take It with You (1938)
 You Don't Shoot at Angels (1960)
 You Will Be My Wife (1932)
 You're Never Too Young (1955)
 You're Only Young Twice (film) (1952)
 You've Got Mail (1998)
 Young America (1932 film)
 Young as You Feel (1940 film)
 Young Bride (1932)
 Young and Willing (1943)
 Young Medardus (1923)
 Young Mrs. Winthrop (1920)
 Young Romance (film) (1915)
 The Young Victoria (1963 film)
 Young Woodley (1928 film)
 Young Woodley (1931 film)
 Youthful Folly (1934)

Z 
 Zaza (1915 film) 
 Zaza (1923 film) 
 Zaza (1939 film)
 Zoot Suit (film) (1981)

See also
 Film adaptation
 Musical film
 Lists of film source material
 :Category:Films based on works by William Shakespeare

References

Plays adapted into feature films
Lists of plays
Lists of works adapted into films
Films

Lists of films based on works